= 2022 New Year Honours (New Zealand) =

Awards list for New Zealand

- Previous: 2021 New Zealand bravery awards Next: 2022 Queen's Birthday and Platinum Jubilee Honours
- Type: New Zealand royal honours: New Zealand Order of Merit; Royal Victorian Order; Queen's Service Order; Queen's Service Medal; New Zealand Distinguished Service Decoration
- Date: 31 December 2021
- Country: New Zealand
- Total recipients: 184

The 2022 New Year Honours in New Zealand were appointments by Elizabeth II in her right as Queen of New Zealand, on the advice of the New Zealand government, to various orders and honours to reward and highlight good works by New Zealanders, and to celebrate the passing of 2021 and the beginning of 2022. They were announced on 31 December 2021.

The recipients of honours are displayed here as they were styled before their new honour.

== New Zealand Order of Merit ==
The following people were appointed to the various levels of the New Zealand Order of Merit.

=== Dame Companion (DNZM) ===
- Lisa Marie Carrington MNZM – of Forrest Hill. For services to canoe racing
- Sophie Frances Pascoe MNZM – of St Albans. For services to swimming
- Janet Marie Shroff CNZM CVO – of Wellington. For services to the State and the community
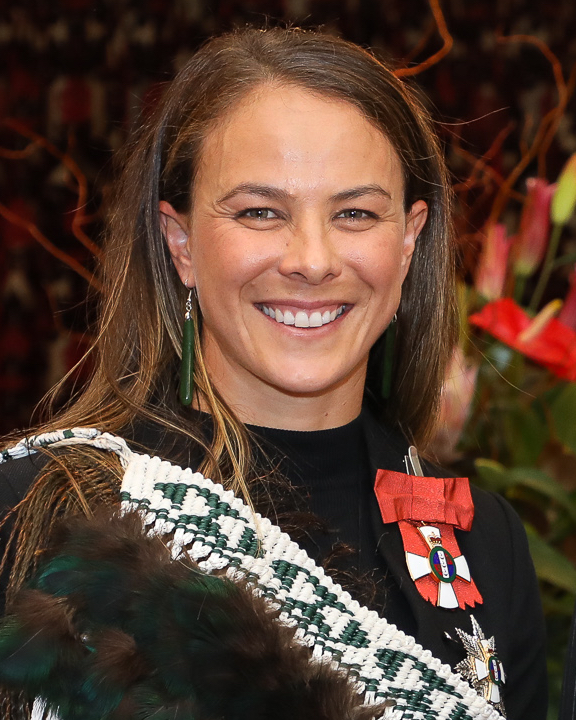
Dame Lisa Carrington

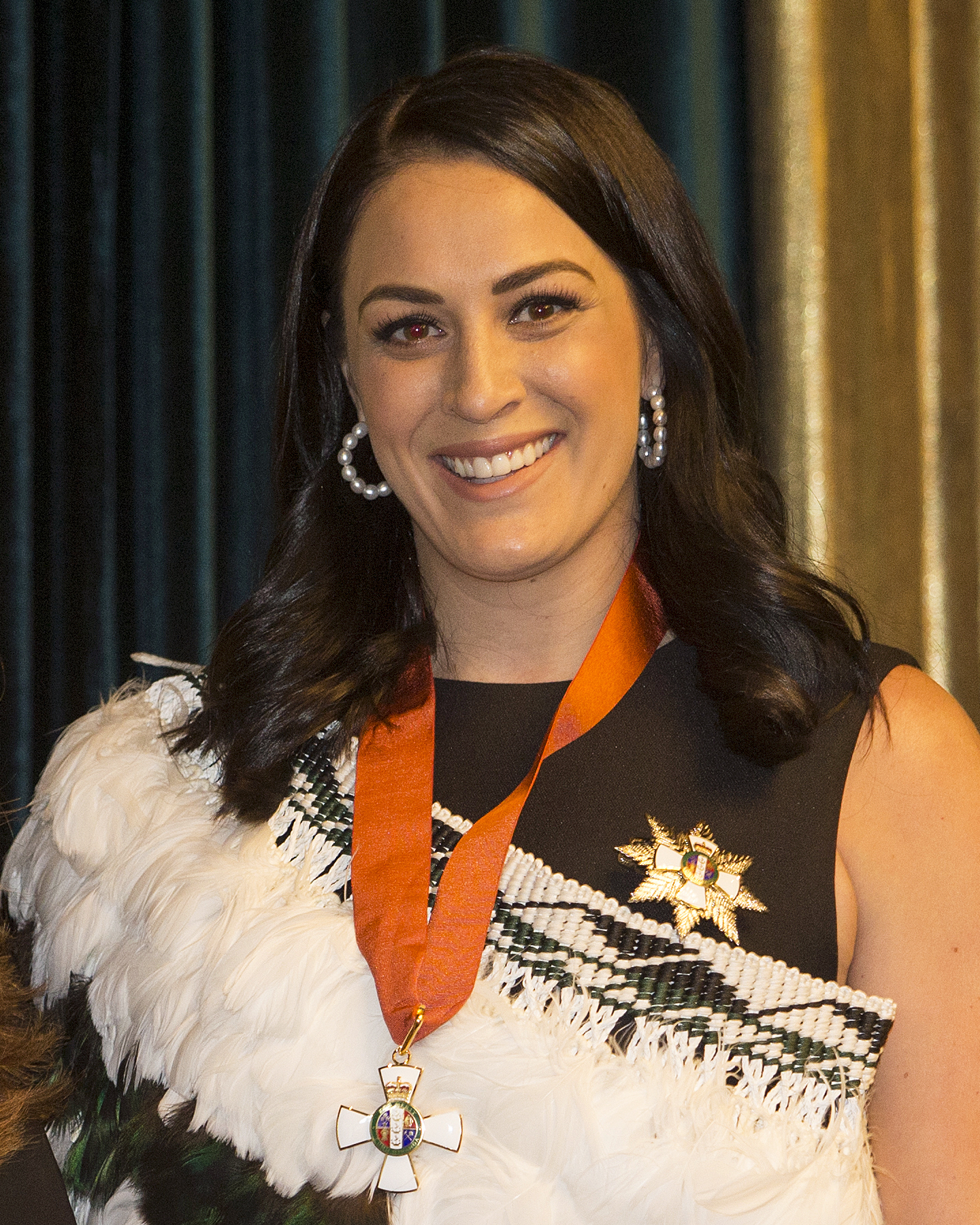
Dame Sophie Pascoe

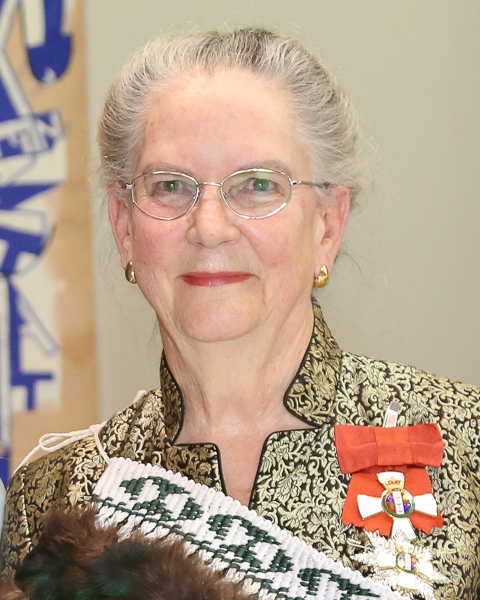
Dame Marie Shroff

=== Knight Companion (KNZM) ===
- Christopher Patrick Thomas Farrelly – of Whangārei. For services to health and the community.
- Robert Nairn Gillies – of Utuhina. For services to Māori and war commemoration.
- Professor Joel Ivor Mann CNZM – of Waverley. For services to health.
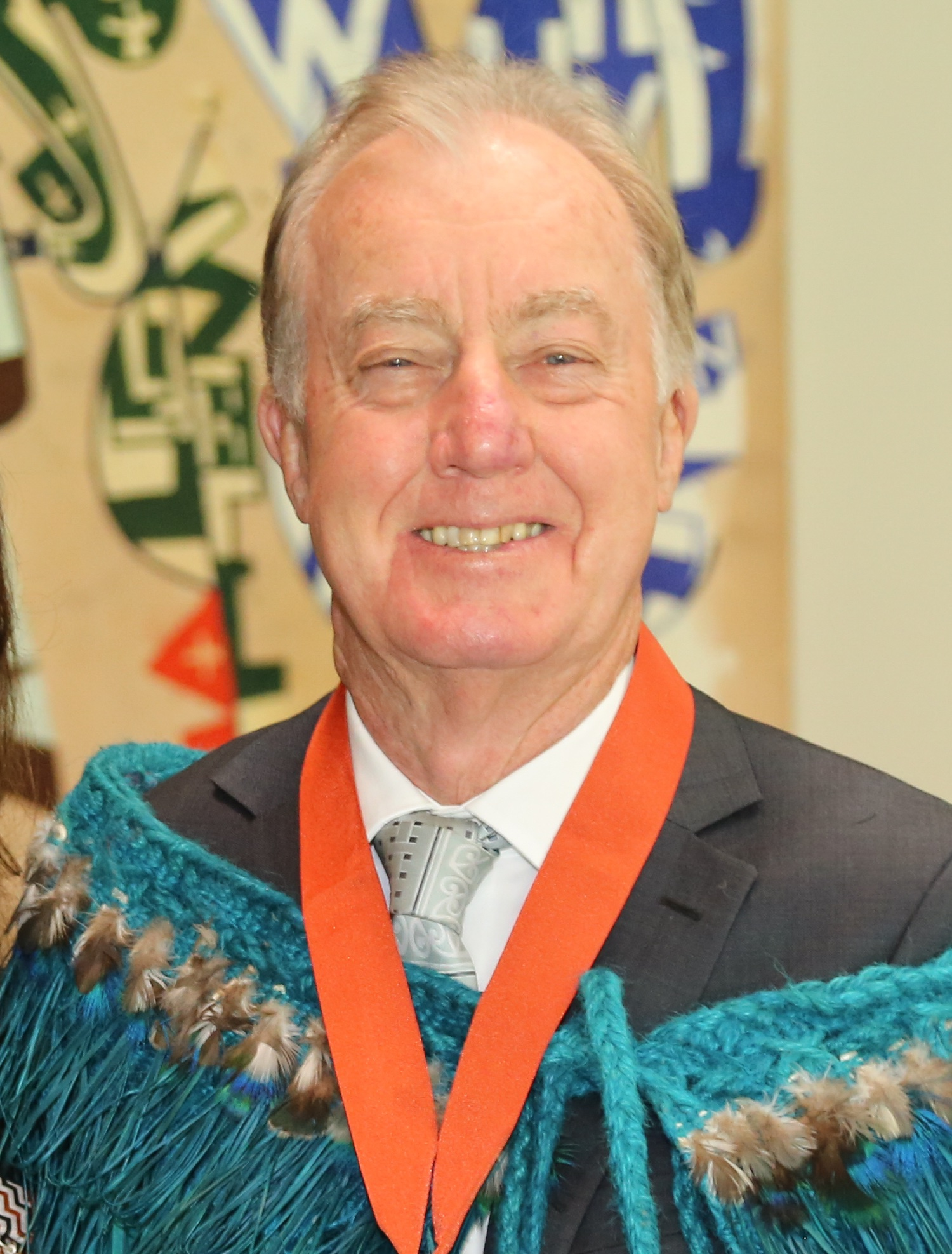
Sir Chris Farrelly

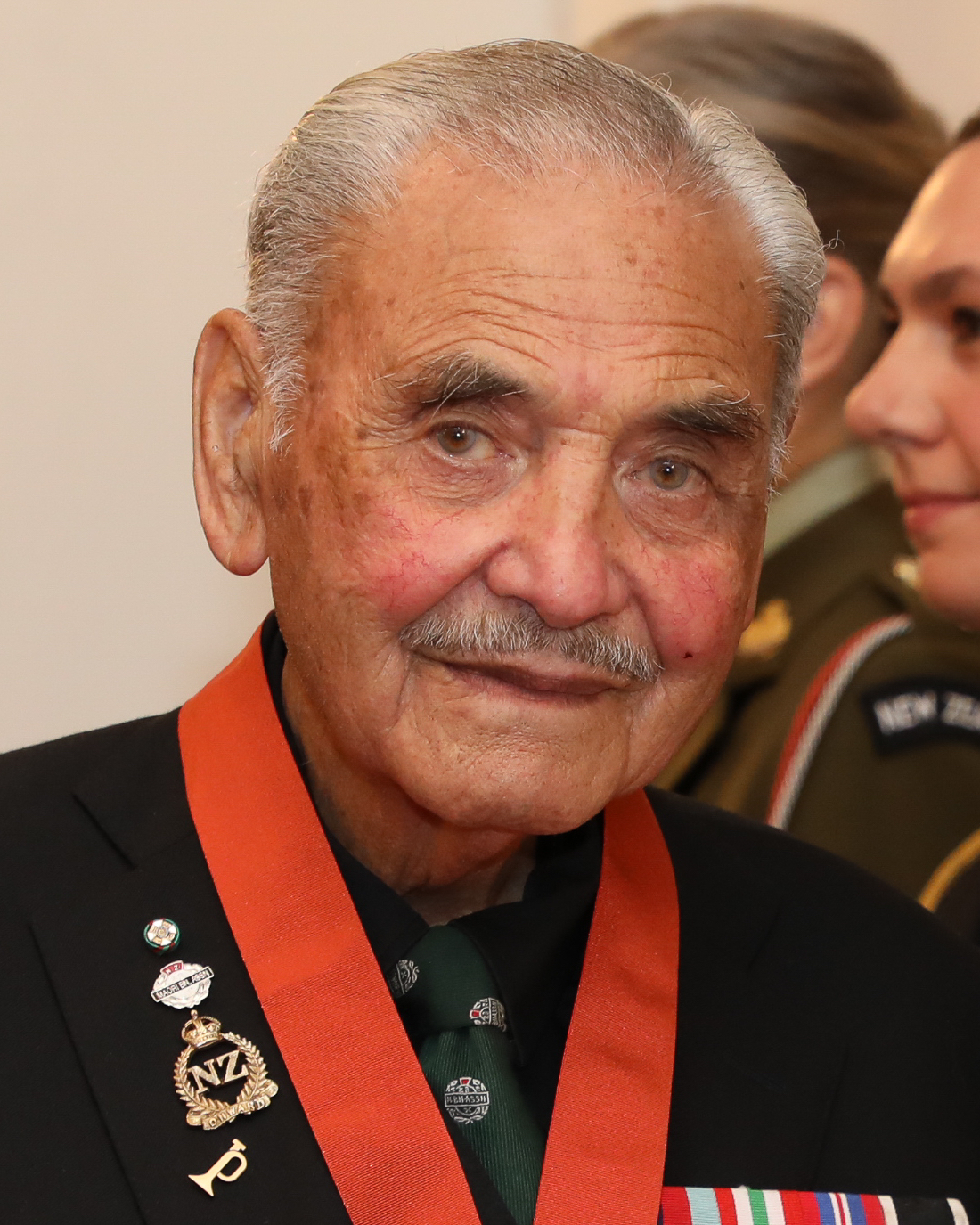
Sir Bom Gillies

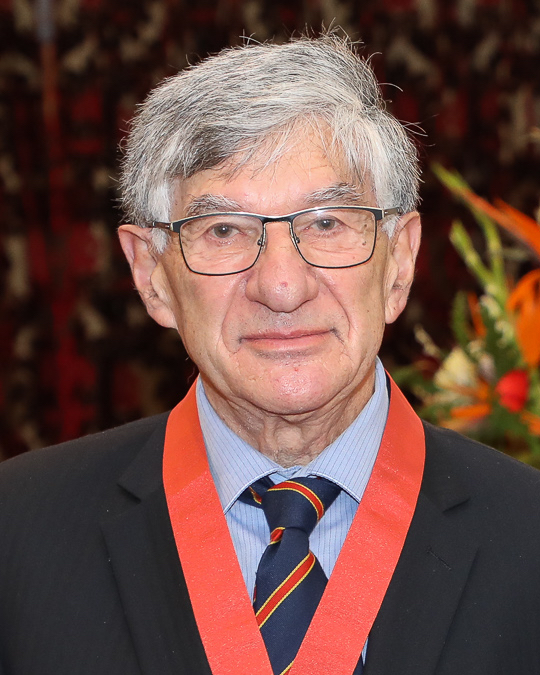
Sir Jim Mann

=== Companion (CNZM) ===
- Peter David Broughton (Rāwiri Paratene) ONZM – of Saint Heliers. For services to Māori, film and theatre.
- David Ronald Brunsdon – of Raumati Beach. For services to engineering and emergency management.
- Professor Philip Howard Butler – of Ilam. For services to science, education and health.
- Dr Michael William Dunbier – of Ilam. For services to agricultural science.
- Rodger Denis Fox ONZM – of Terrace End. For services to music.
- Dr Michèle Margaret Hawke – of Hawarden. For services to gymnastics.
- Professor Harlene Hayne ONZM – of Burswood, Western Australia. For services to health and wellbeing.
- Helen Christine Lake – of Ilam. For services to Plunket.
- Dr Geoffrey Bevan Lorigan – of Epsom. For services to business and leadership development.
- Professor Emeritus Stuart Alan Middleton ONZM JP – of Remuera. For services to education.
- Neil Andrew Richardson – of Pukete. For services to business and philanthropy.
- John David Rosser – of Mount Eden. For services to choral music.
- Dr Arapera Royal Tangaere – of Tawa. For services to Māori and education.
- Faumuina Professor Fa’afetai Sopoaga – of Leith Valley. For services to Pacific health and tertiary education.
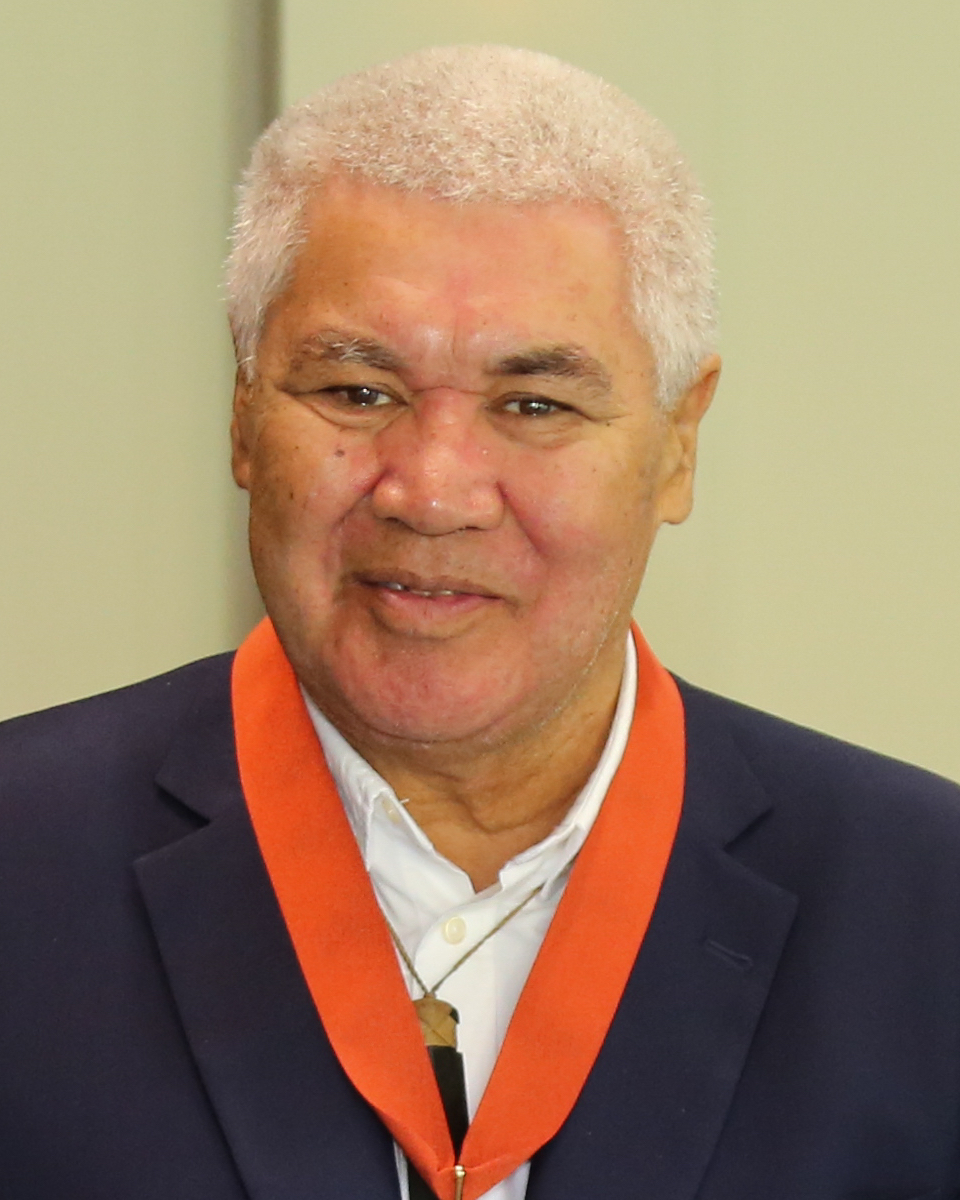
Rāwiri Paratene

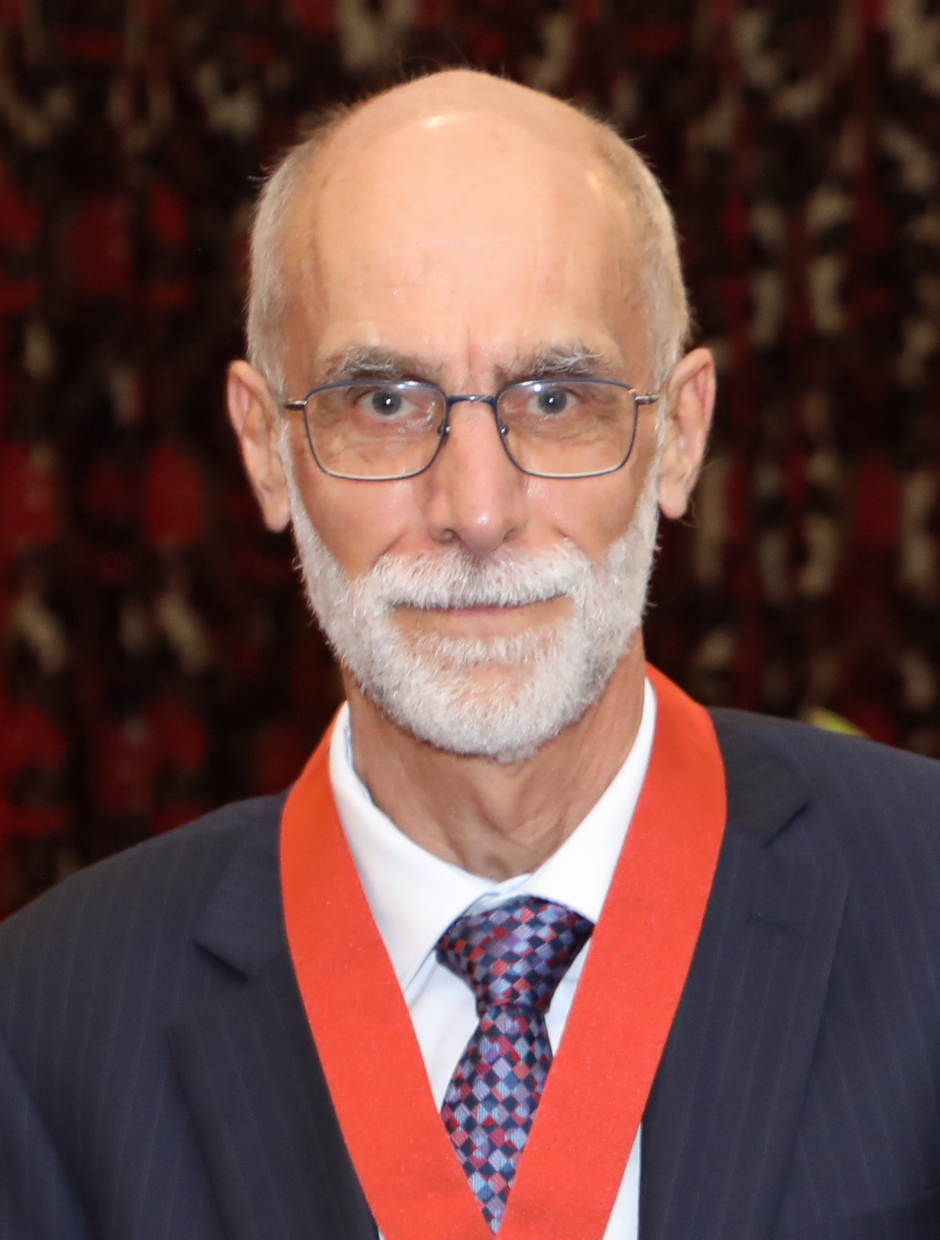
David Brunsdon

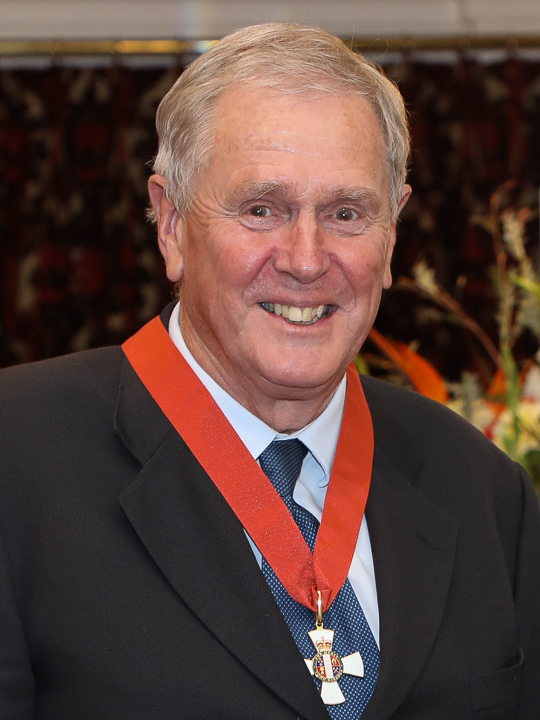
Phil Butler

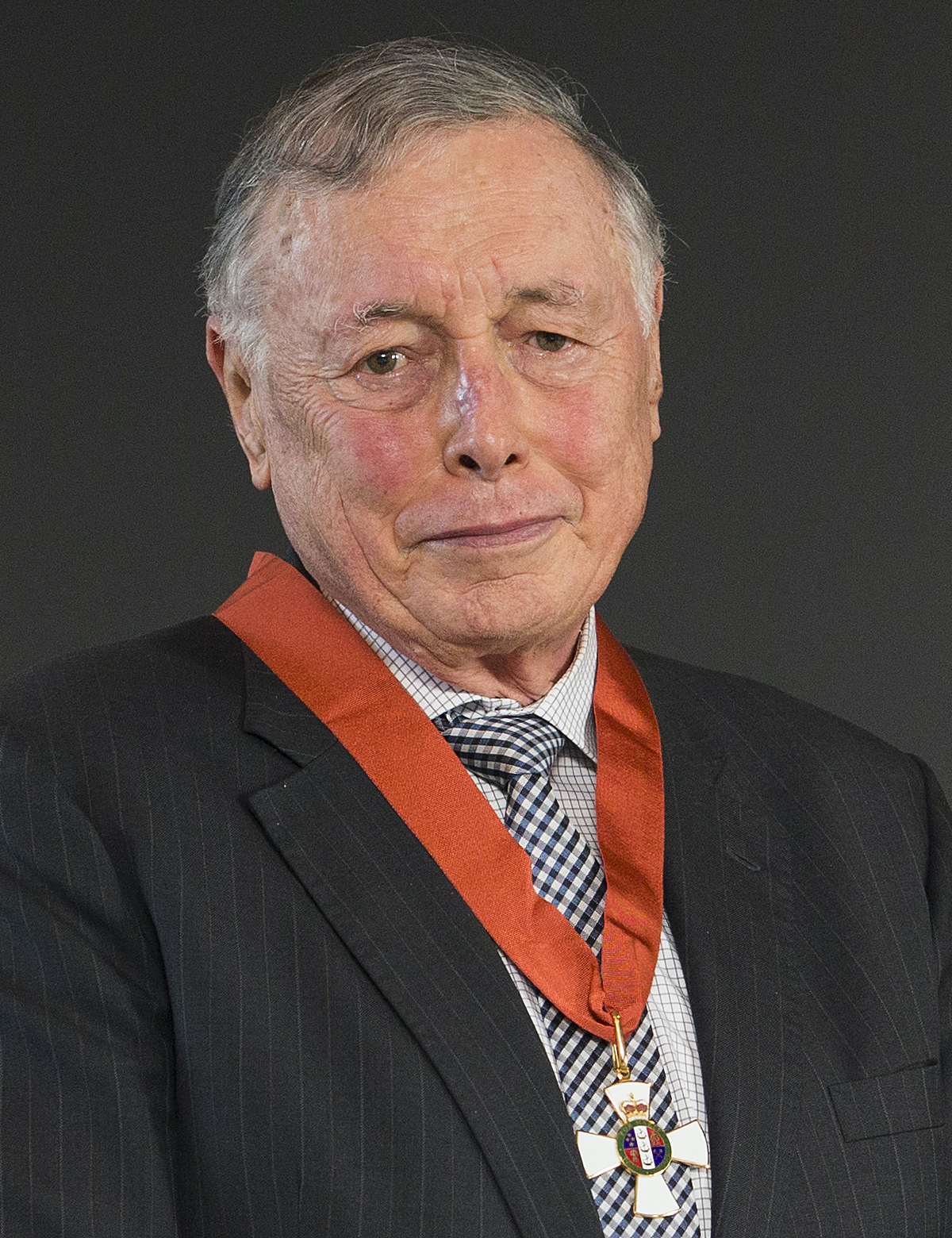
Michael Dunbier

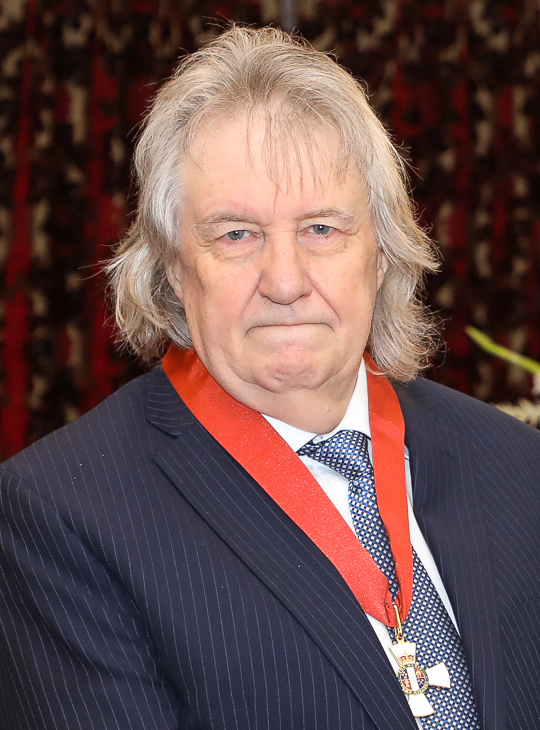
Rodger Fox

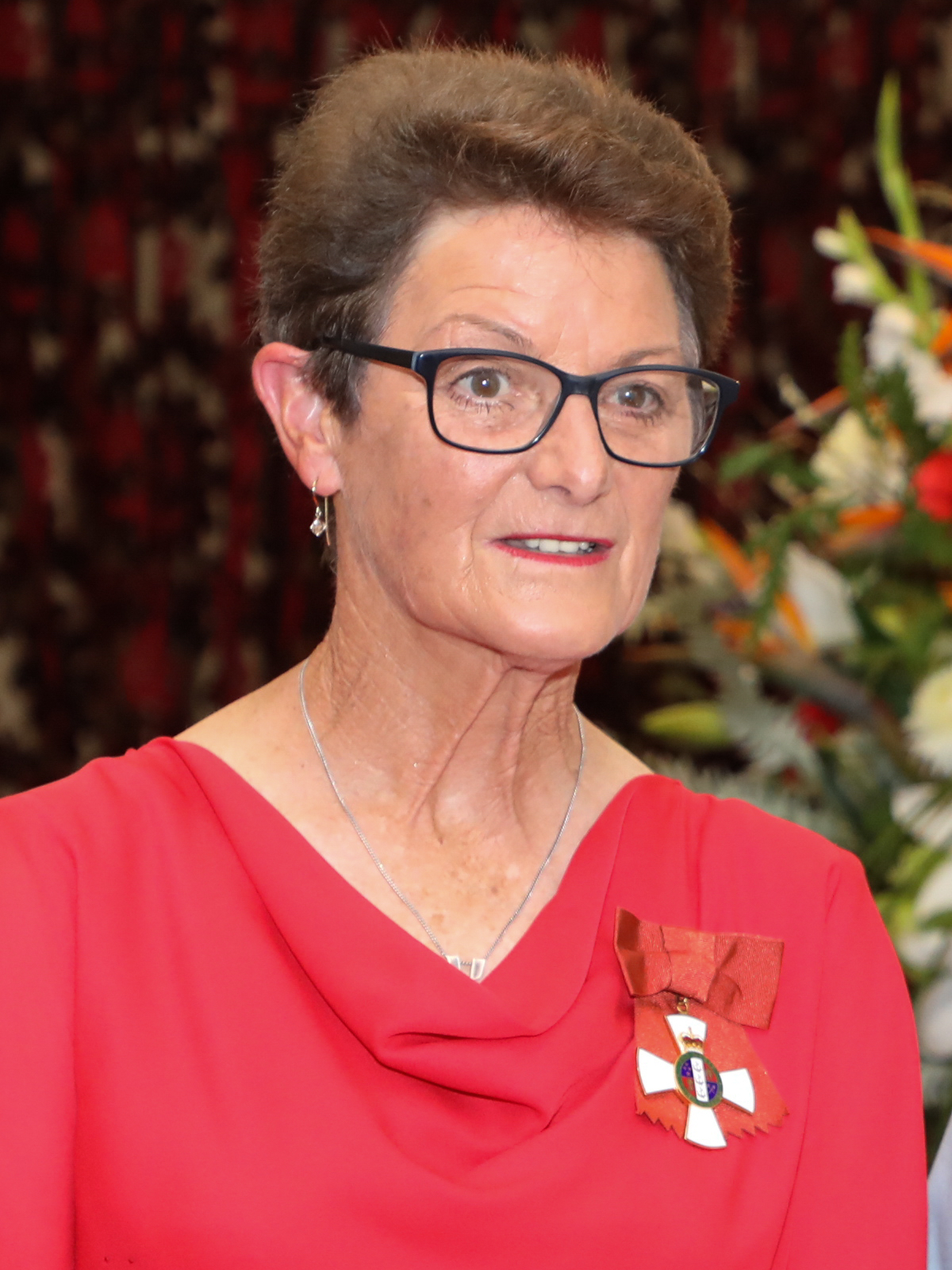
Michèle Hawke

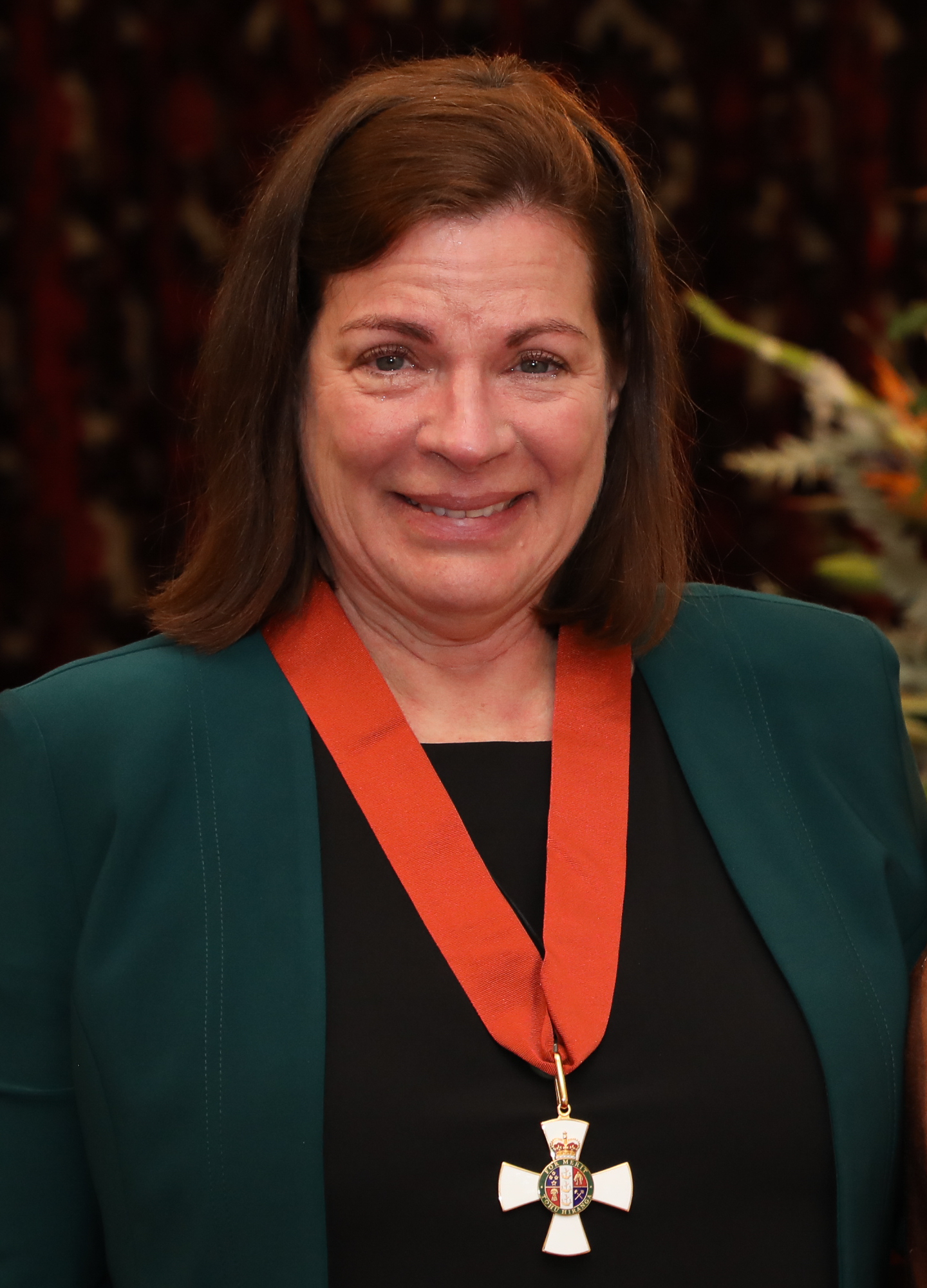
Harlene Hayne

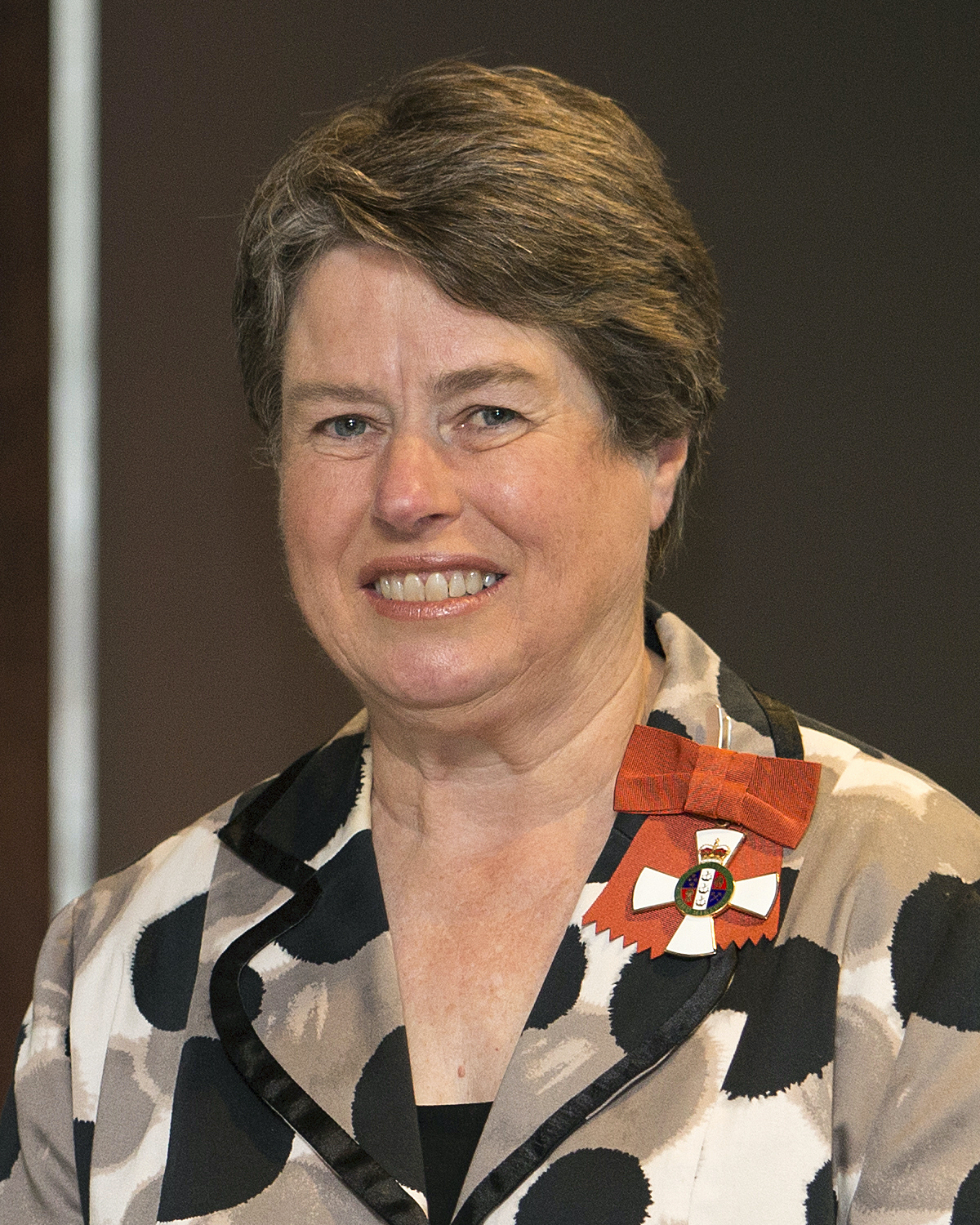
Christine Lake

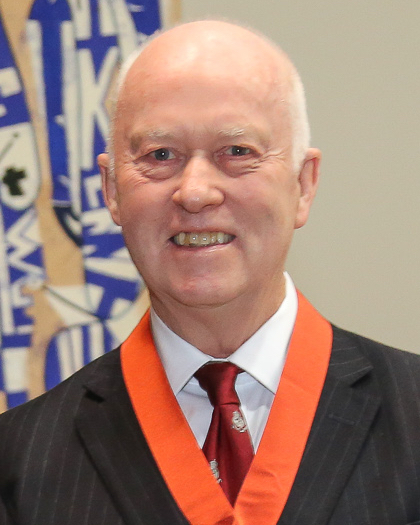
Geoff Lorigan

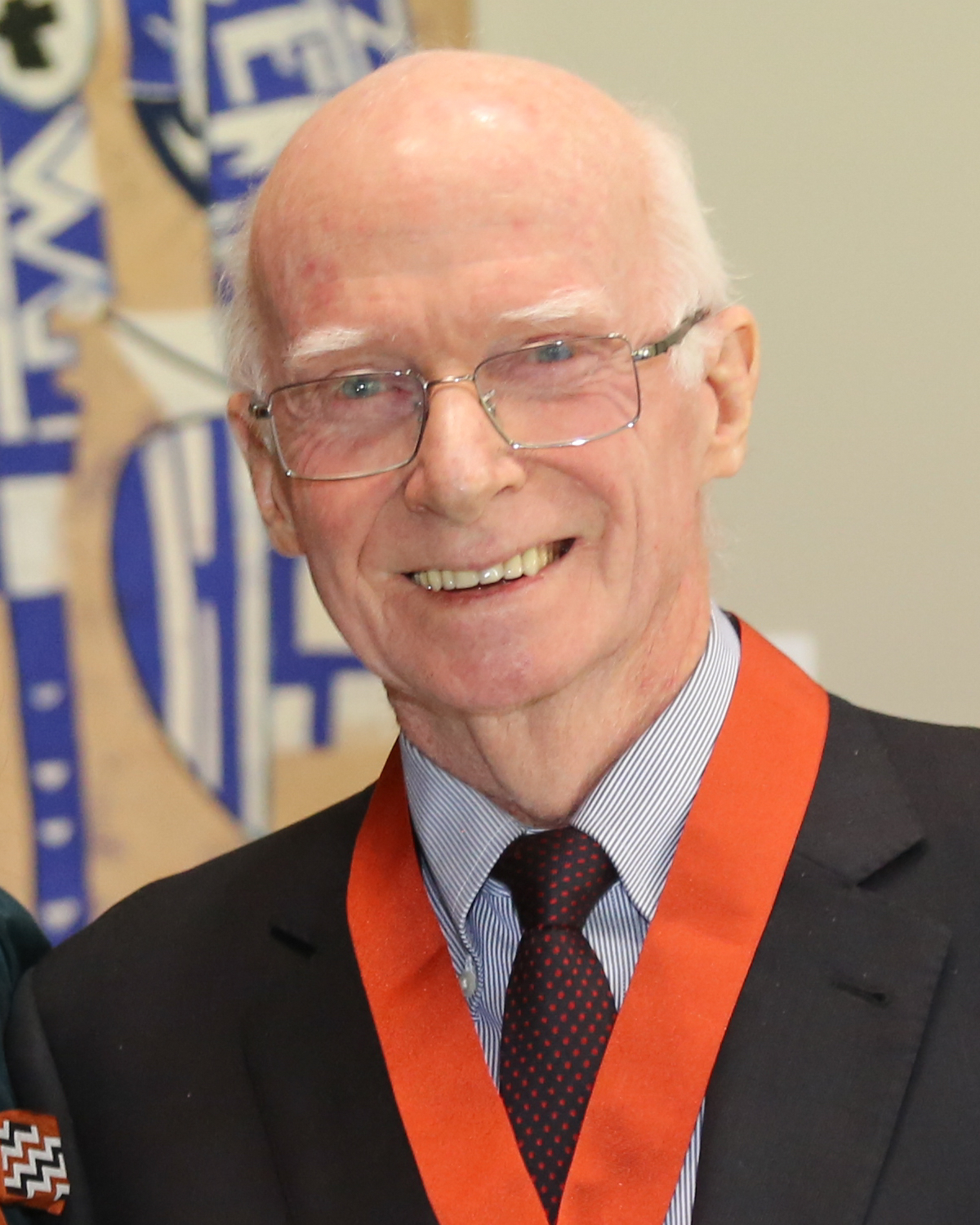
Stuart Middleton

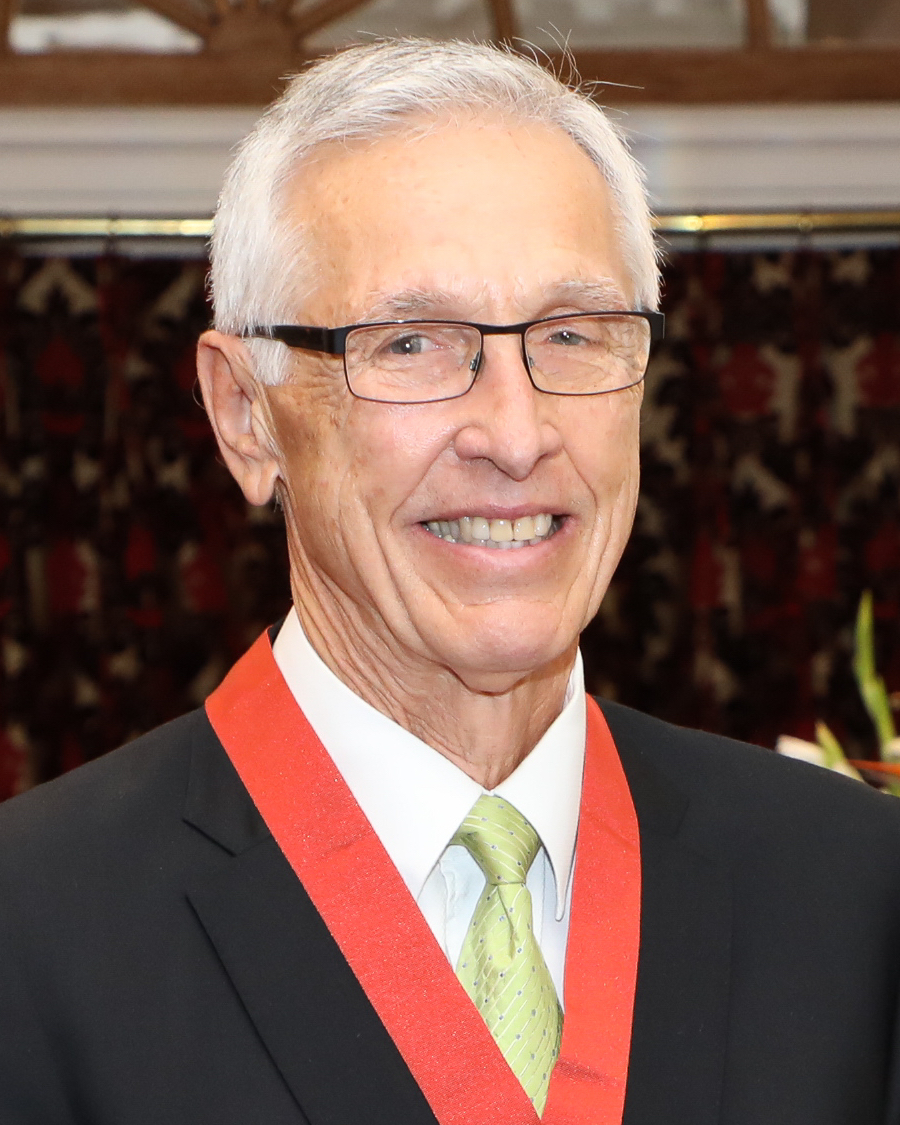
Neil Richardson

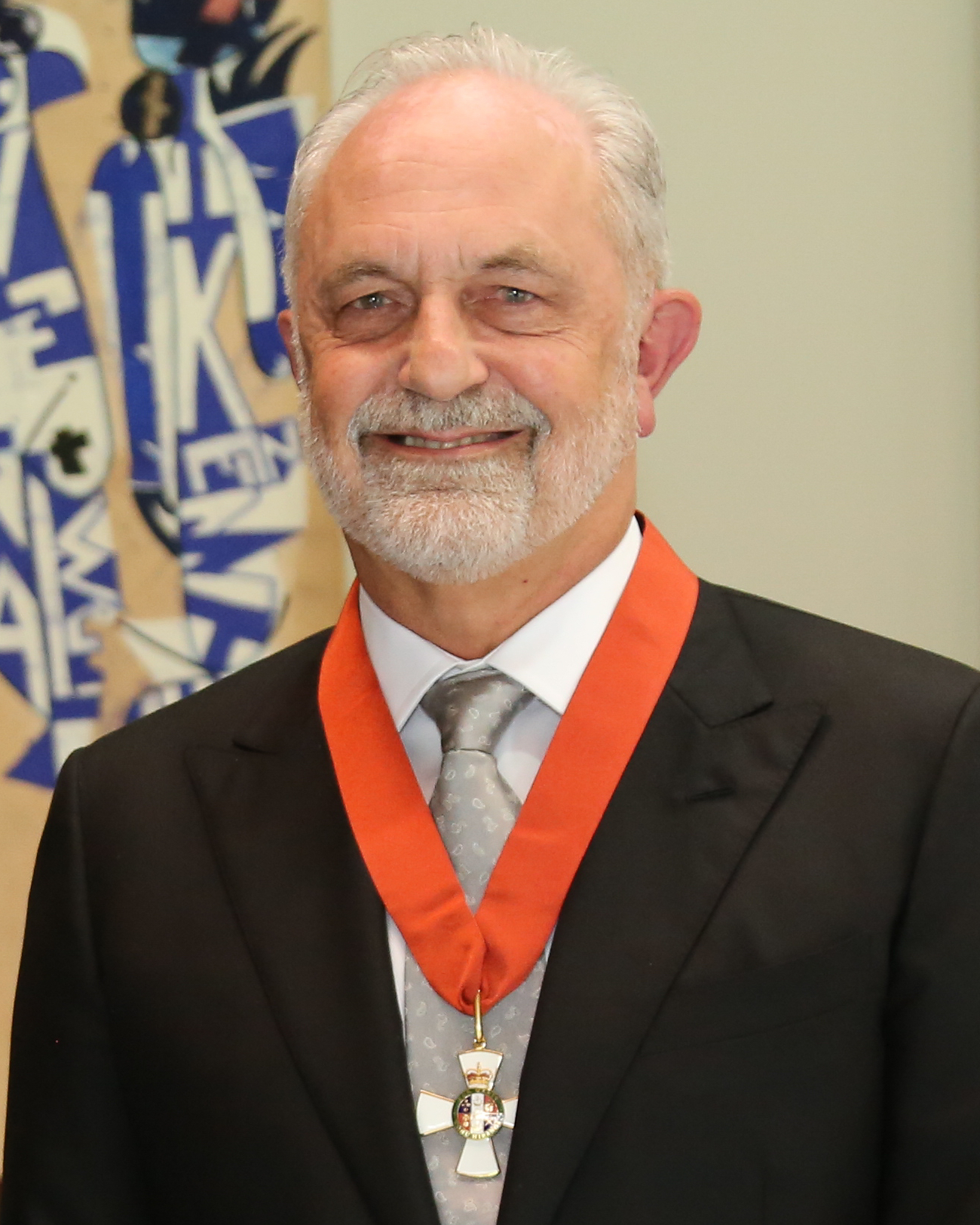
John Rosser

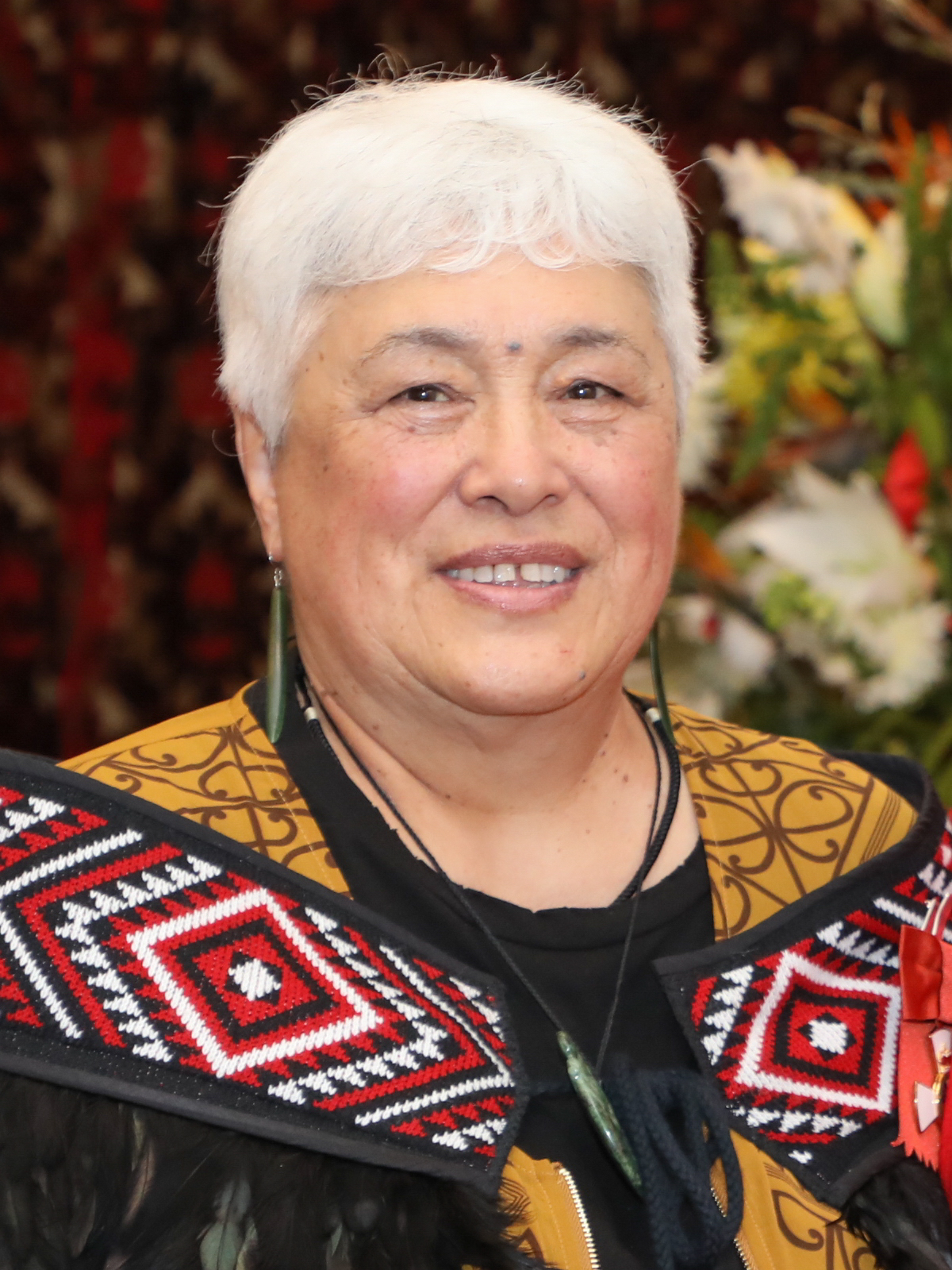
Arapera Royal Tangaere

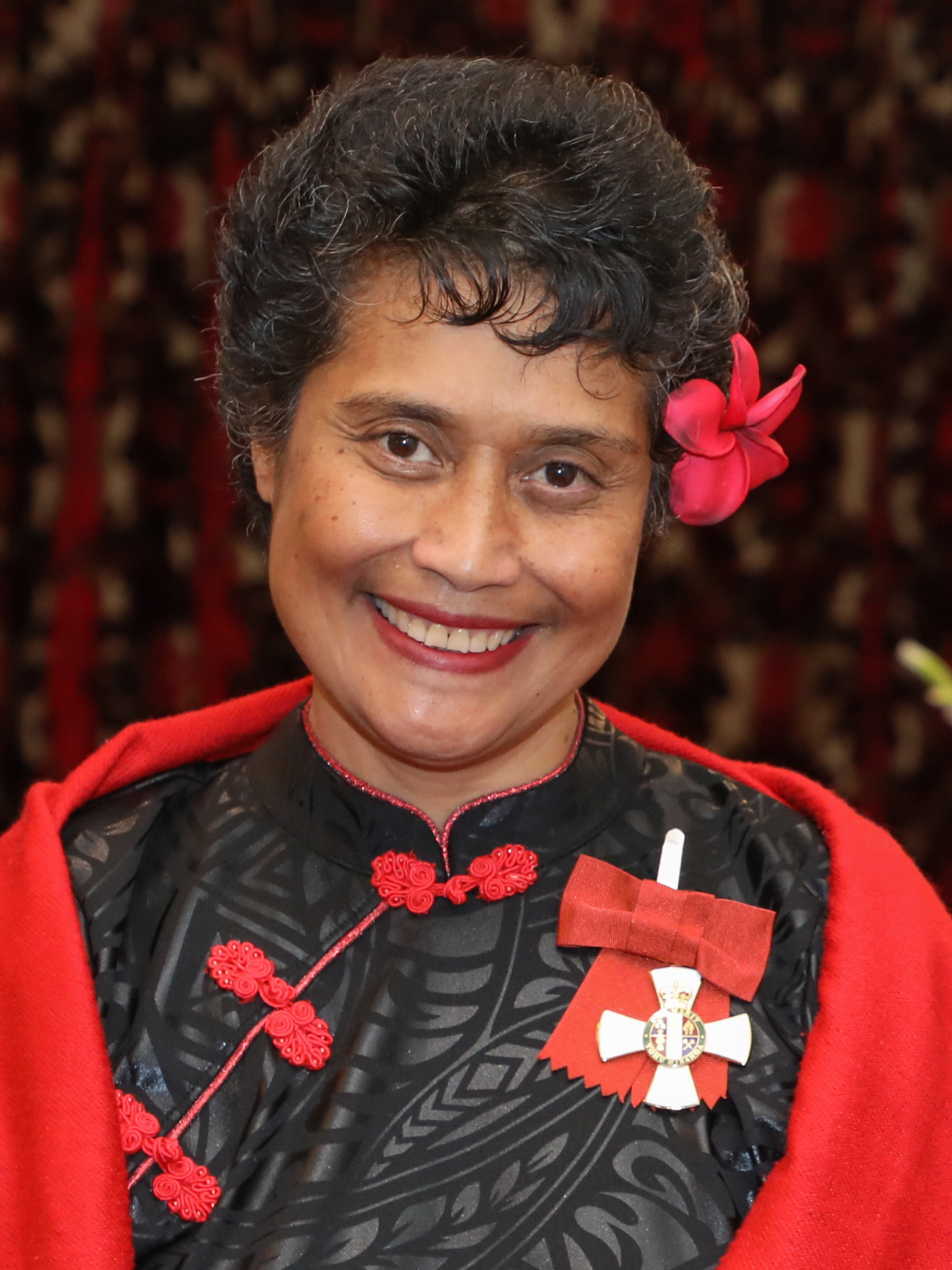
Fa'afetai Sopoaga

=== Officer (ONZM) ===
- Tuita’alili Vaitava’e Su’a Aloese-Moe JP – of Māngere East. For services to the Pacific community.
- George Chandrakumar Arulanantham QSM JP – of Hillsborough. For services to the community.
- William John Blakey – of Warkworth. For services to education.
- Dr Linda Julia Morcombe Bryant – of Wellington Central. For services to pharmacy and health.
- Gaye Maree Bryham – of Pakuranga Heights. For services to sport and recreation.
- Alison Pauline Cadman – of Island Bay. For services to housing and the community.
- Emeritus Professor Ralph Paul Cooney – of Kaipara Flats. For services to science and innovation.
- Prodhumun Dayaram – of Arnold Valley. For services to orthopaedics.
- Dr Peter Francis Fennessy – of Roslyn. For services to agricultural science and business.
- Deborah Louise George – of Parnell. For services to education and governance.
- Dr Anthony Jonathan Royce Godfrey – of West End, Palmerston North. For services to disabled people, particularly blind and low vision people.
- Anne Marie Te Puata Grennell – of Dinsdale. For services to health.
- Bronwyn Elizabeth Hayward – of Karori. For services to people with disabilities and the arts.
- Richard Bond Hoskin – of Birkenhead. For services to the blind and people with low vision.
- Professor John David Hutton – of Kelburn. For services to women's health education.
- Clare Francesca Jacobs (Dr Clare Healy) – of Upper Riccarton. For services to medical forensic education.
- Dr Angela Jean Jury – of Himatangi Beach. For services to victims of family and sexual violence.
- Phillip Ross Ker – of Cromwell. For services to tertiary education.
- Raymond Stanley Lind – of Canberra. For services to industry training governance.
- John Bowden Mackintosh – of Bluff Hill, Napier. For services to the legal profession.
- Superintendent Peter Andrew McGregor – of Papamoa Beach. For services to the New Zealand Police and the community.
- Rosemary Margaret McLeod – of Newtown. For services to journalism and television.
- Dr Lindsay Francis James Mildenhall – of Mount Eden. For services to neonatal intensive care and resuscitation training.
- Roger Holmes Miller – of Waikanae Beach. For services to governance and the community.
- Dianne Mary Milne – of Dobson. For services to the rural community.
- Ross Mitchell-Anyon – of Gonville. For services to the arts.
- Professor Evan Paul Moon – of West Harbour. For services to education and historical research.
- Dr Christopher David Moyes – of Ōhope. For services to health.
- Alexander Nathan – of Whangārei. For services to Māori and art.
- Celia Mary Patrick – of Devonport. For services to tennis.
- Detective Superintendent Peter Dunbar Read – of Redwood Valley, Richmond. For services to the New Zealand Police and the community.
- Peter James Simpson – of Woodend. For services to education.
- Campbell Roy Smith – of Waiaro, Coromandel. For services to the music industry.
- Monica Stockdale – of Taradale. For services to Māori health.
- Jane Tehira – of New Lynn. For services to sport.
- Laura Gail Thompson MNZM – of Gladstone. For services to Paralympic cycling.
- James Edward Tucker – of Lower Vogeltown. For services to journalism.
- Victor Thomas Walker – of Tolaga Bay. For services to the Māori community.
- Sina Moana Wendt – of Mount Albert. For services to governance.
- Malcolm Ashley Wong – of Kew, Dunedin. For services to the community and New Zealand–China relations.
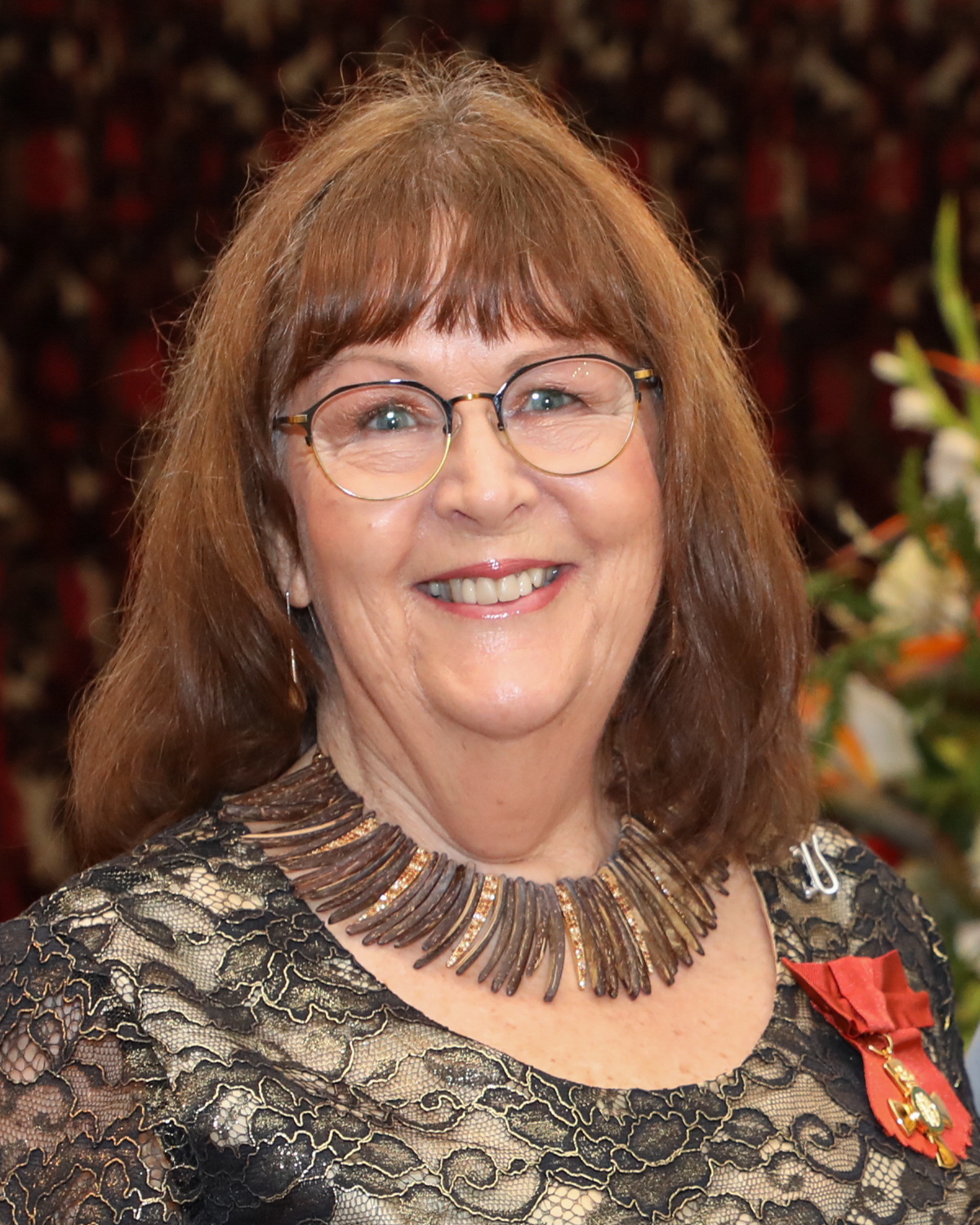
Linda Bryant

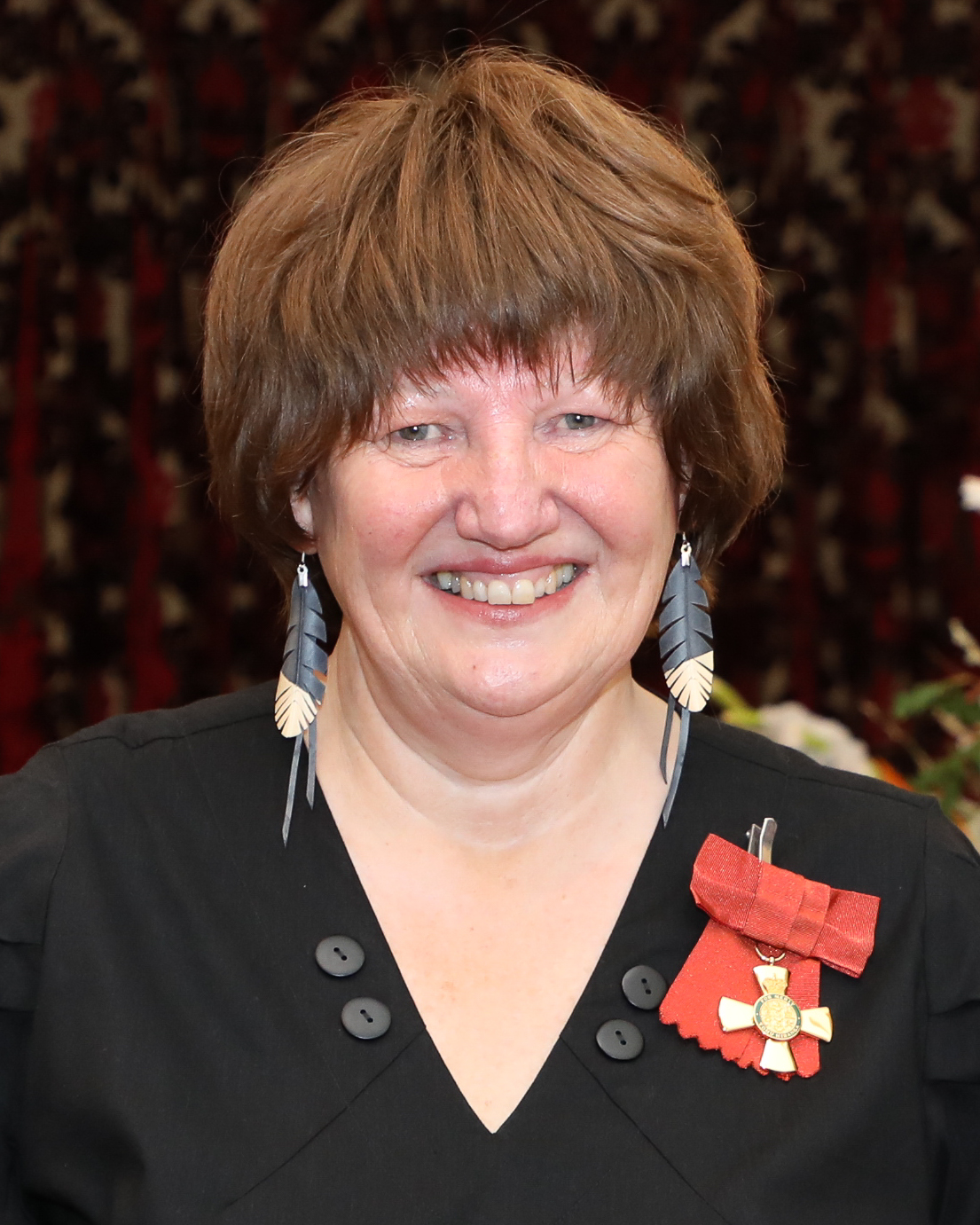
Alison Cadman

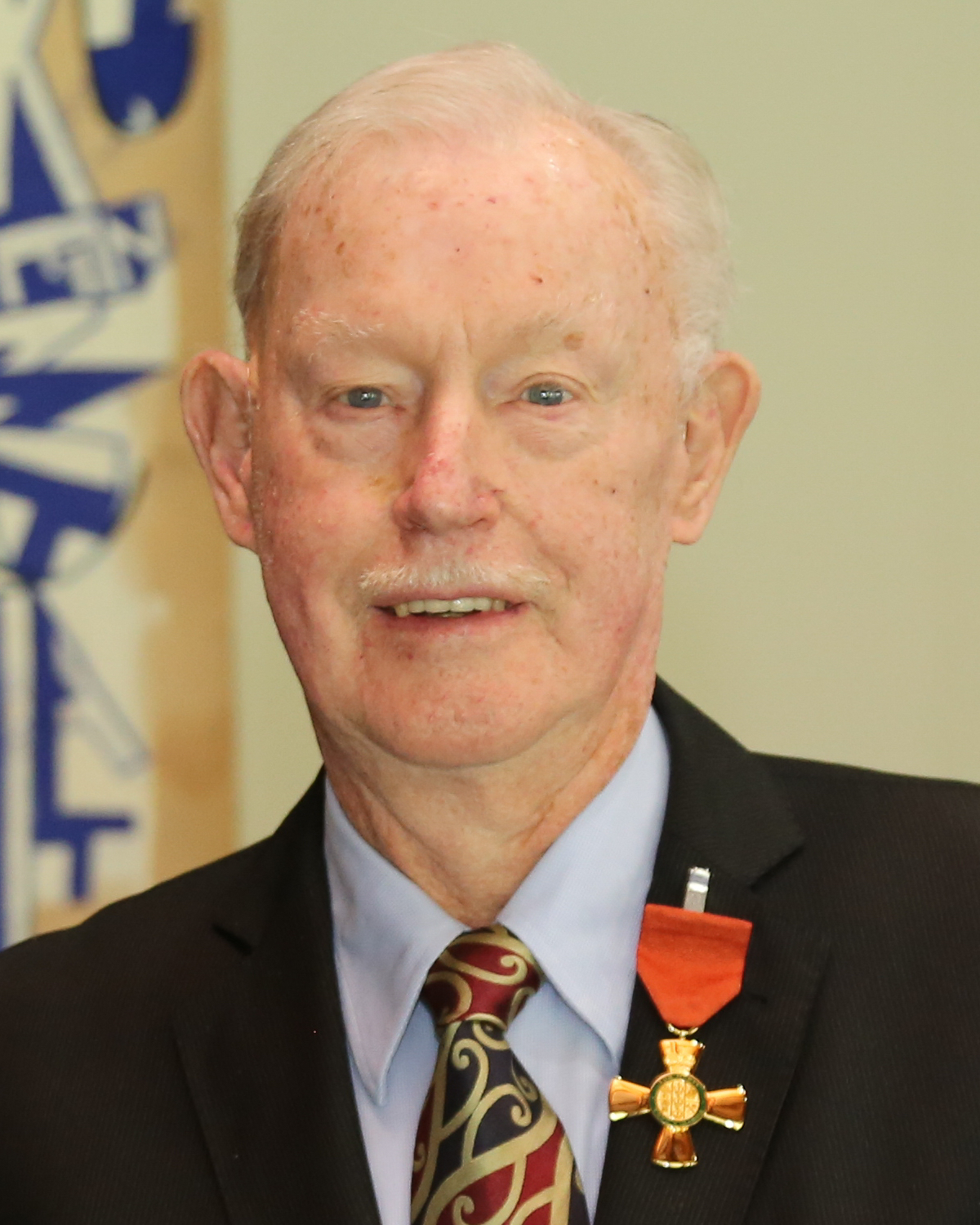
Ralph Cooney

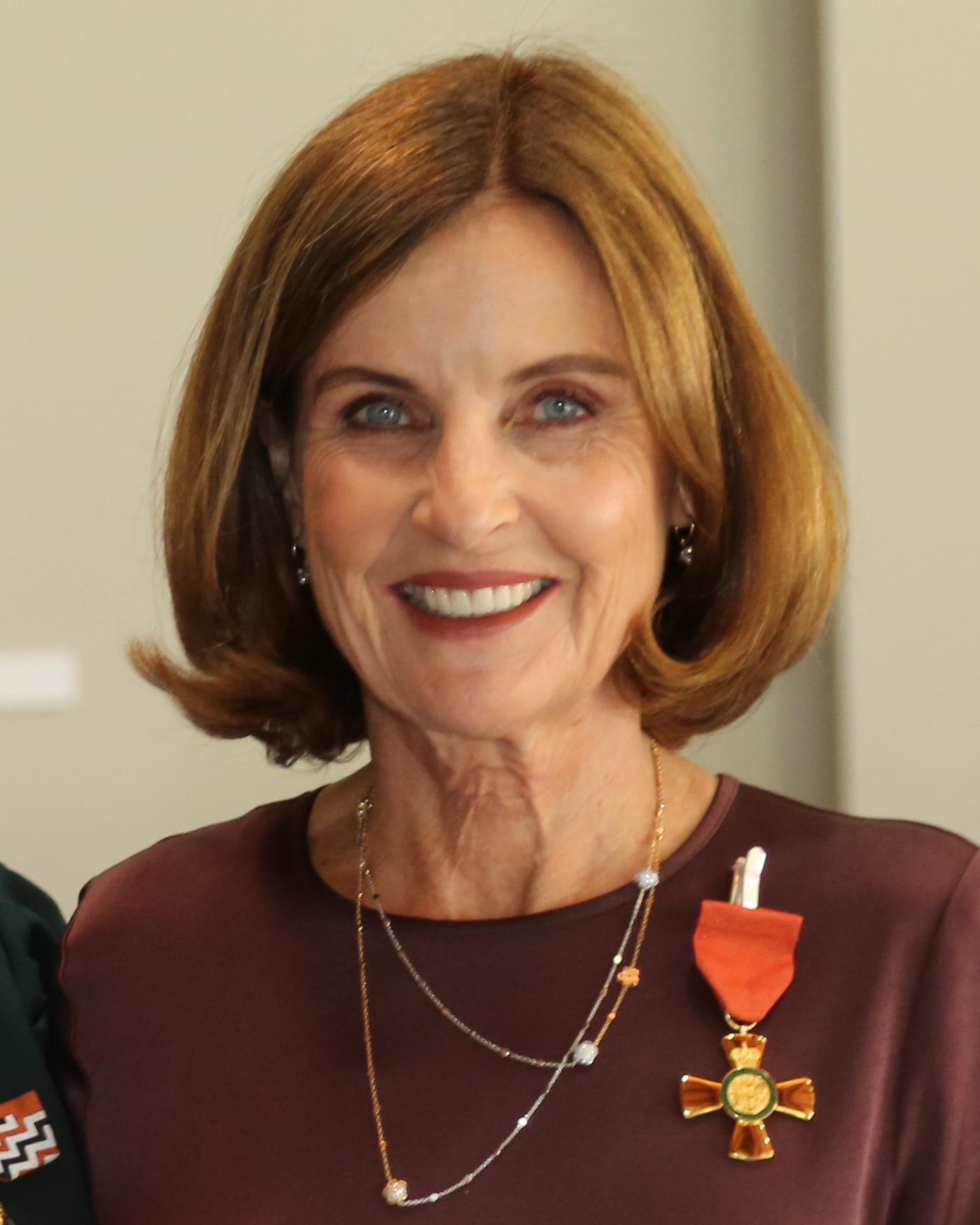
Deborah George

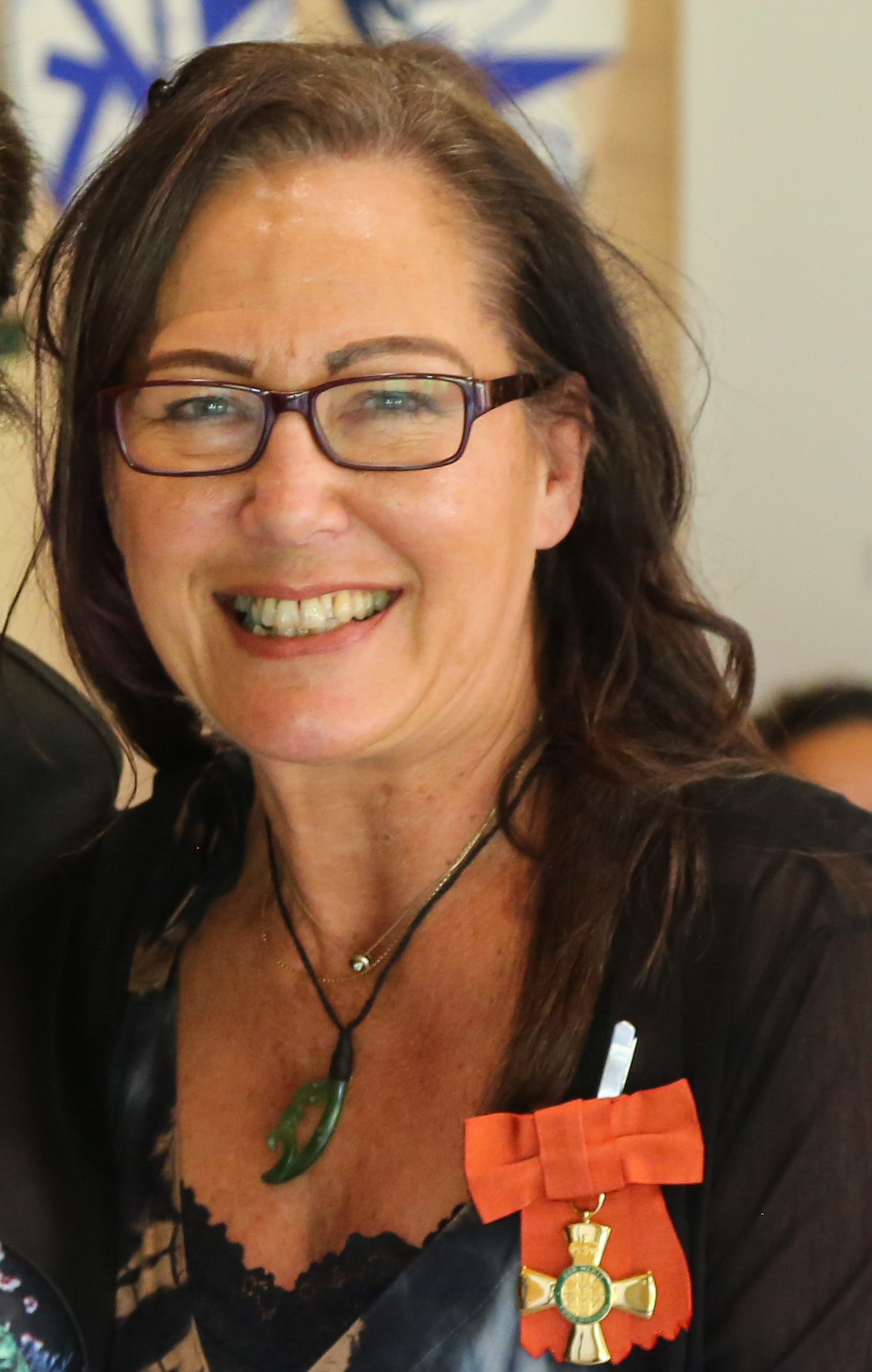
Ann Grennell

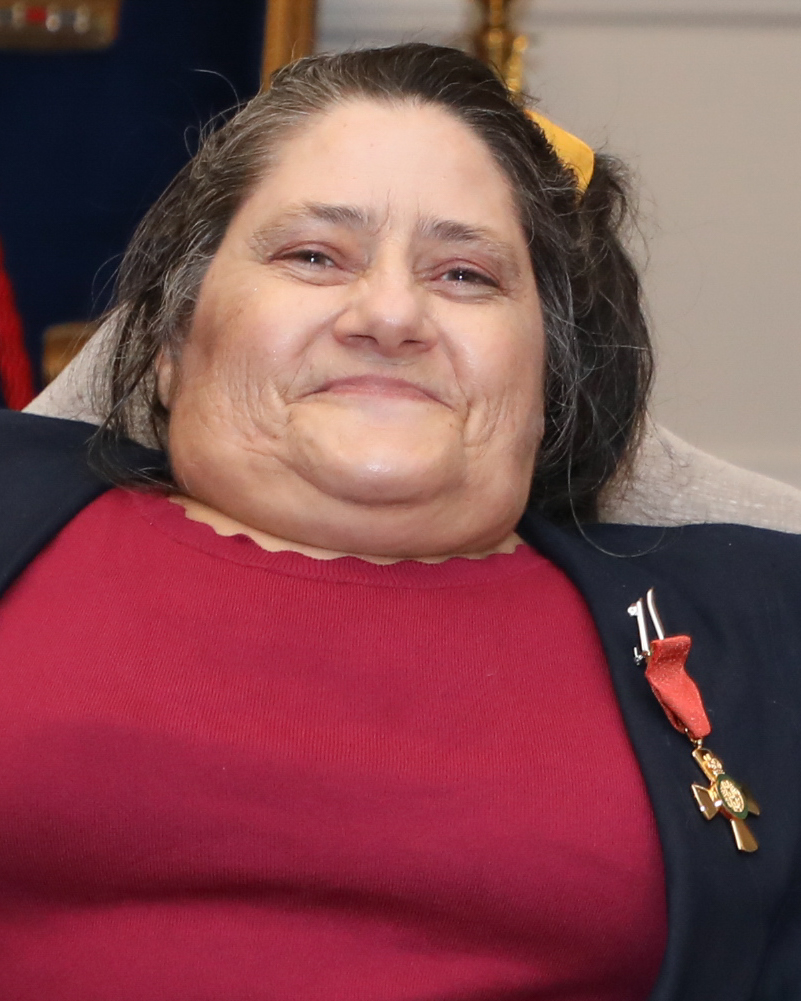
Bronwyn Hayward

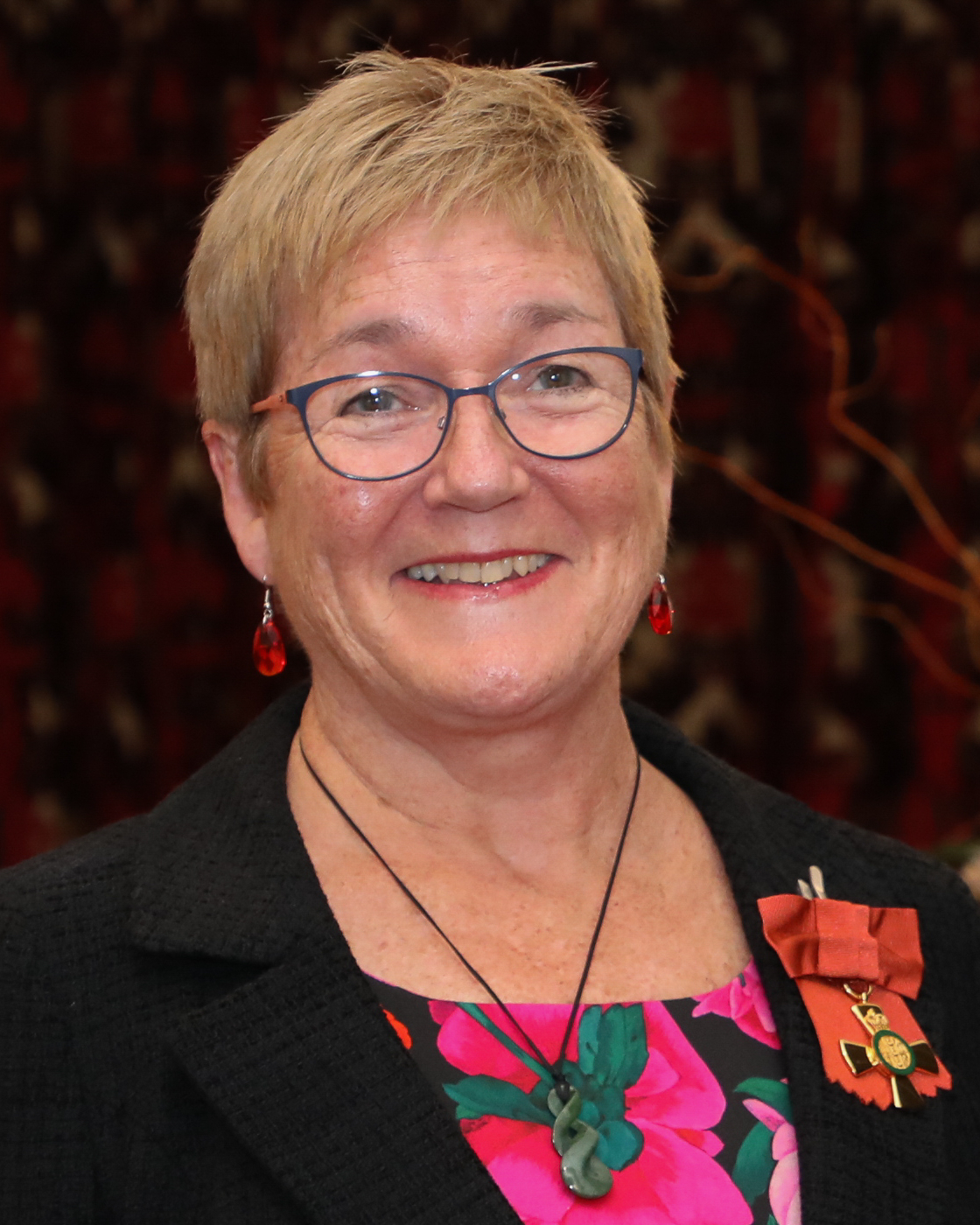
Clare Healy

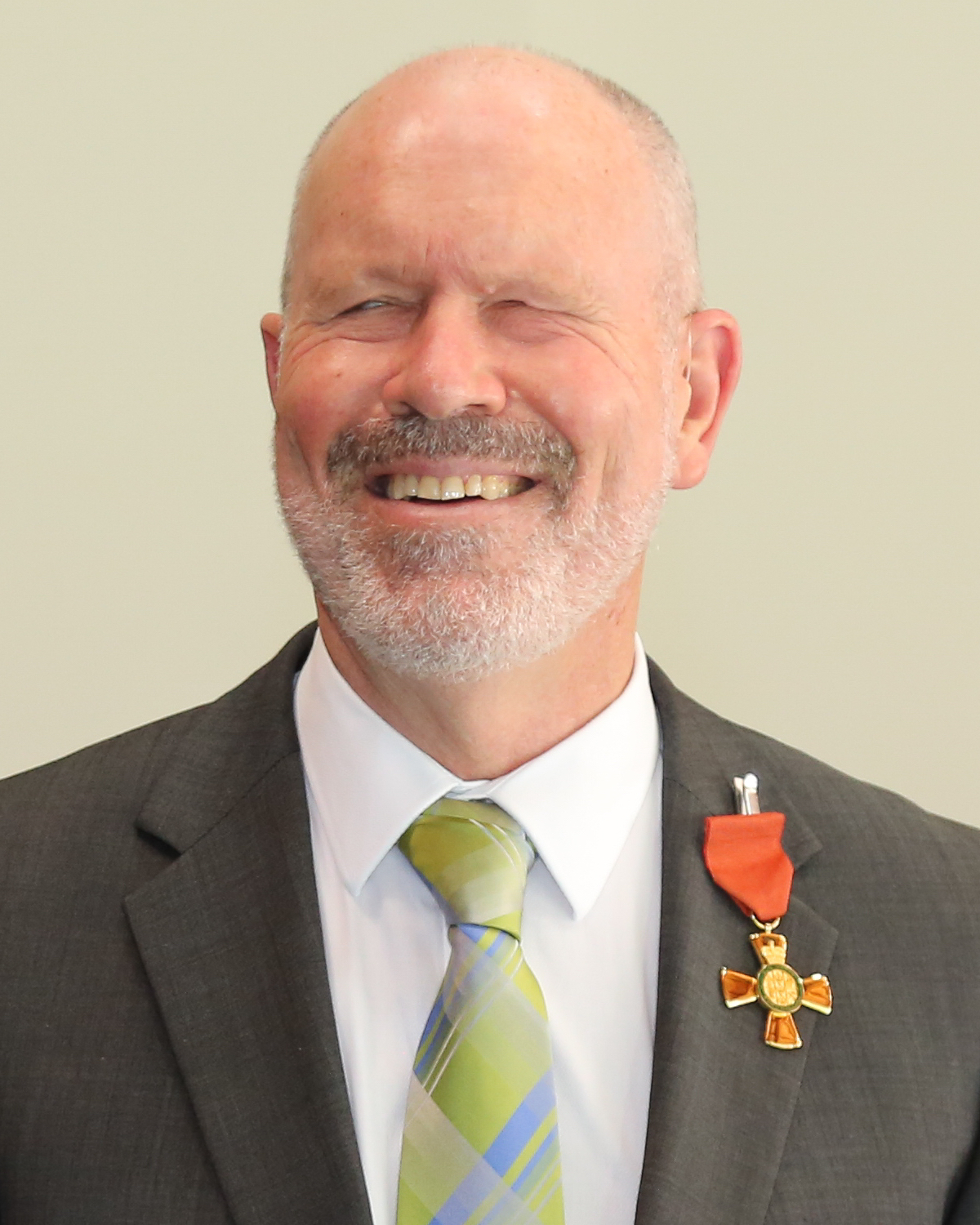
Rick Hoskin

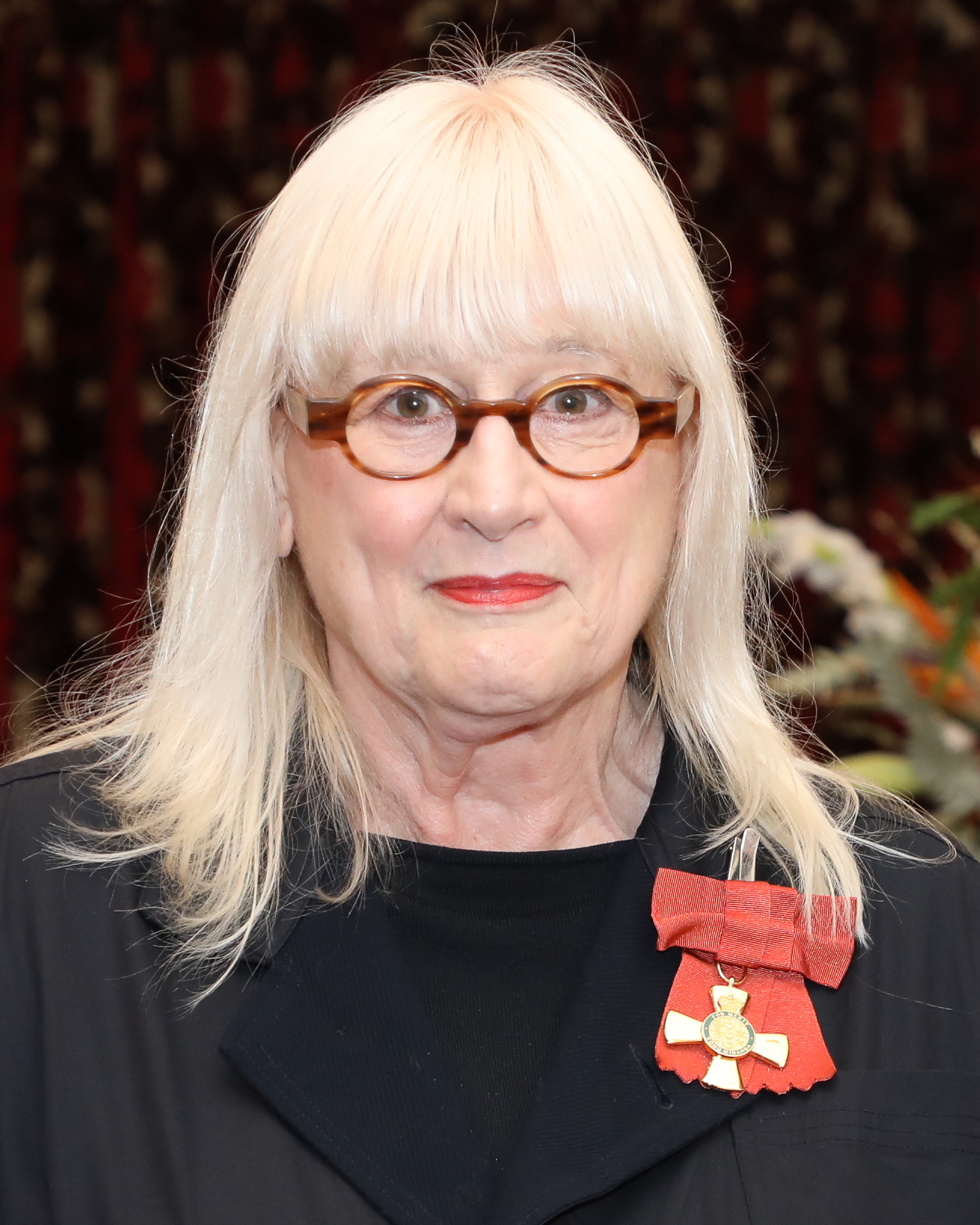
Rosemary McLeod

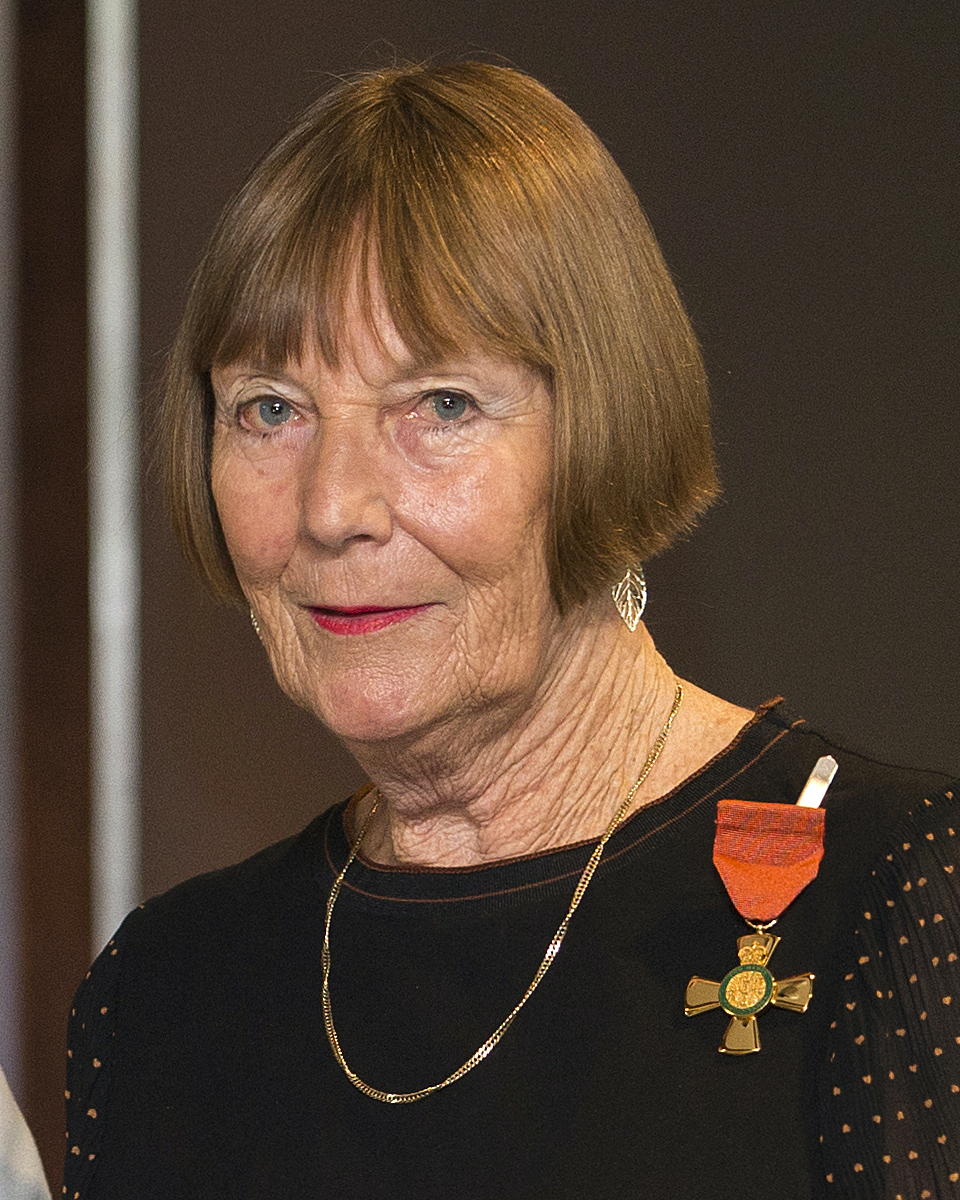
Dianne Milne

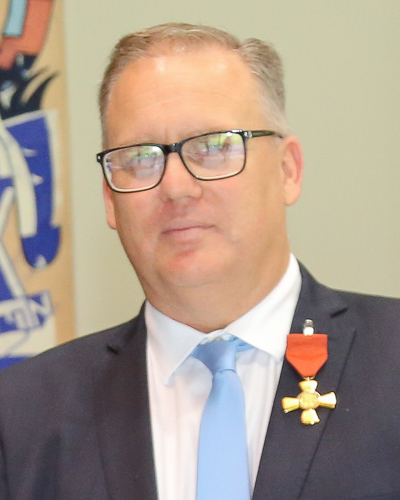
Paul Moon

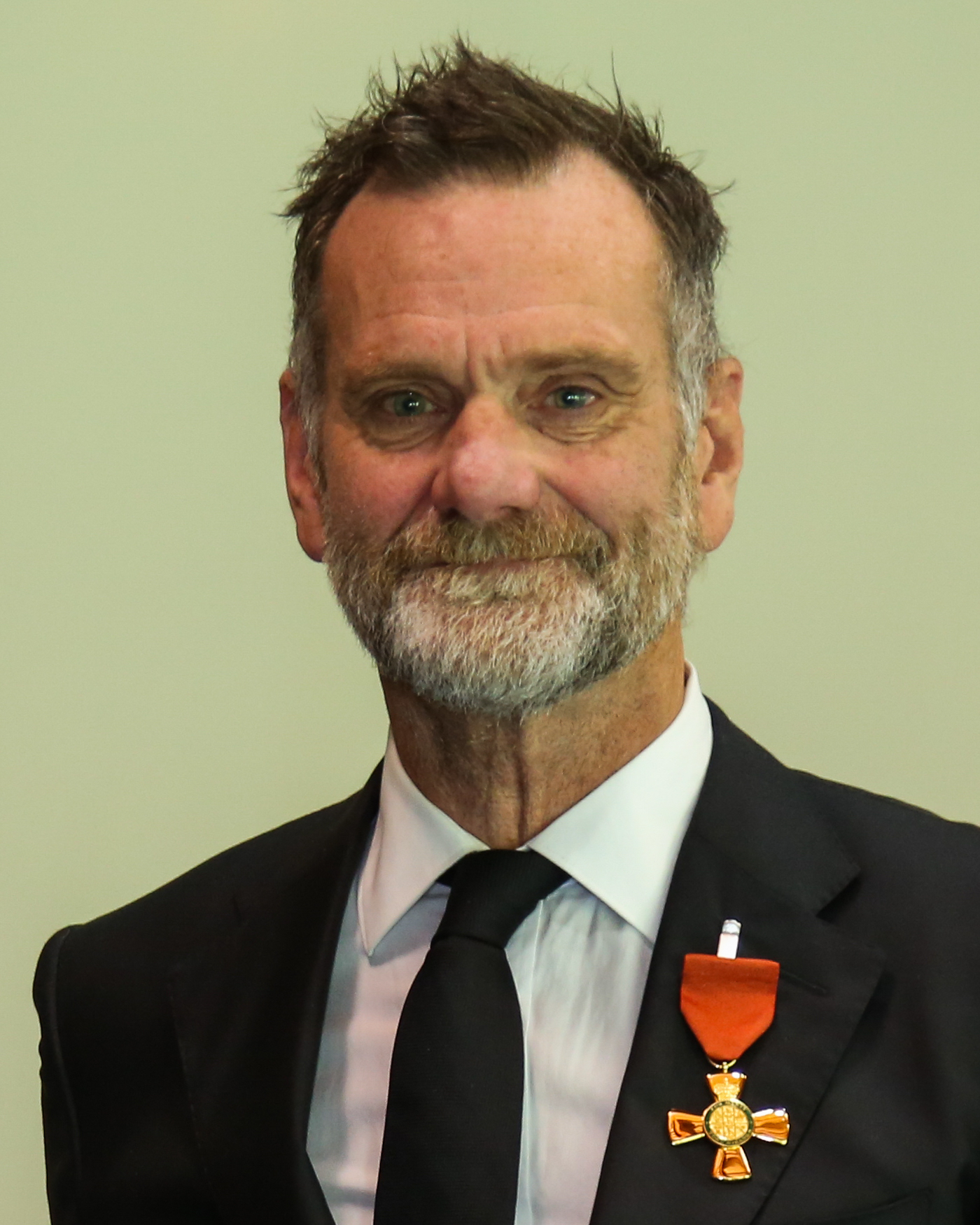
Campbell Smith

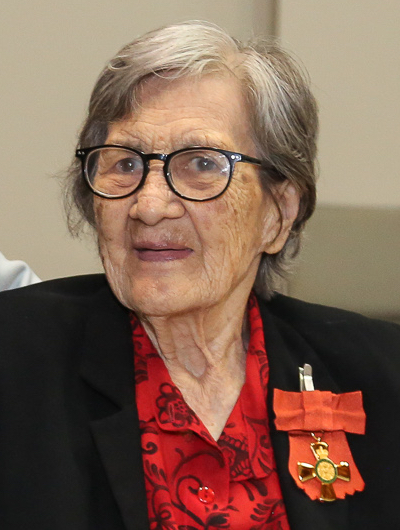
Jane Tehira

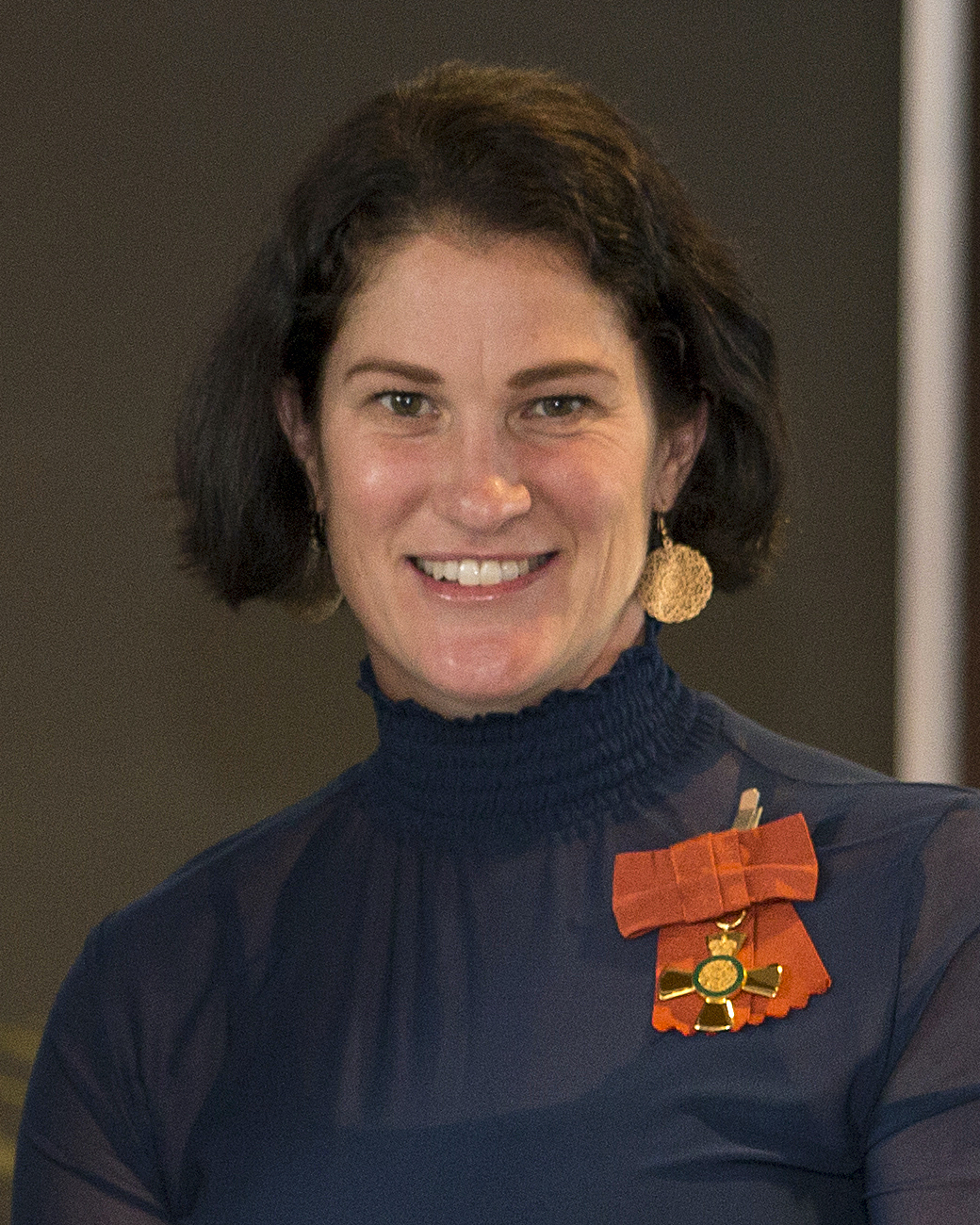
Laura Thompson

=== Member (MNZM) ===
- Farid Ahmed – of Hoon Hay. For services to interfaith communities.
- Louise Ānaru-Tangira – of Mangōnui. For services to education.
- Dr Alison Patricia Barrett – of Hamilton. For services to women's health.
- Nigel John Floyd Borell – of Manurewa East. For services to Māori art.
- Anne Marie Borren – of Pukerua Bay. For services to ceramic art.
- Vivien Anna Bridgwater – of Grey Lynn. For services to governance and education.
- Jessie Chan – of Rakaia. For services to dairy and agriculture.
- John William Cheyne – of Waipukurau. For services to conservation.
- Moira Janet Clunie – of Mount Eden. For services to LGBTQI+ communities.
- Rebekah Helen Corlett – of Raumati Beach. For services to education.
- Beverley Grier Douglas – of Pauanui Beach. For services to netball and the community.
- Kevin William Evans – of Ruawai. For services to wildlife conservation and the community.
- Meijia Feng – of Long Bay. For services to health and Asian communities.
- Dr Graeme Holt Fenton – of Riverside, Whangārei. For services to Māori and rural health.
- Alfred Meredith Filipaina – of Māngere Bridge. For services to the New Zealand Police and the community.
- William Eccles (Bill) Fleury – of Marybank, Whanganui. For services to conservation.
- Elizabeth Anne Goodwin – of Lyall Bay. For services to education.
- Gillian Margaret Gordon – of Mataura. For services to musical theatre.
- Cheryl Anne Greer (Cheryl MacDonald) – of Feilding. For services to oncological nursing.
- Tanea Jane Heke – of Miramar. For services to the arts and Māori.
- Alison Maynard Henry – of Whitianga. For services to conservation and the community.
- Melanie Lyn Hewitson – of Mission Bay. For services to governance.
- Dr Kathleen Gaye Irwin – of Ōtaki Beach. For services to Māori education.
- Ian James Jackson – of Devonport. For services to the plumbing industry and the community.
- Judith Anne Jessop – of Sockburn. For services to lifesaving and water safety.
- Ian McKenzie Jordan – of Blenheim. For services to the livestock industry.
- Anthony Rangi Kake – of Pukekohe. For services to Māori.
- Noel James Inglis Kay – of Sandringham. For services to surf lifesaving.
- Shane Patrick McManaway – of Carterton. For services to agriculture and the community.
- James Anderson McPhee – of Birkenhead. For services to judo.
- Susan Mary Miller – of Camborne. For services to agricultural journalism.
- Marilyn Joan Moffatt – of Hataitai. For services to surf lifesaving.
- Dr Rose Namoori-Sinclair – of Ōtaki. For services to the Kiribati community.
- Patrick William Newman – of Tikipunga. For services to education.
- John Rutherfurd Oliver – of Ōtorohanga. For services to philanthropy.
- Robert Mark Oliver – of Morningside. For services to the food industry and Pacific communities.
- Shane (Shannon) Karen Pakura – of Whitby. For services to social work.
- Shelley Aileen Payne – of Tauranga. For services to people with intellectual disabilities.
- Margery Sylvia Pita – of Kamo. For services to music.
- Helen Bernice Purcell – of Kawerau. For services to public health nursing.
- Venkat Raman – of Pakuranga. For services to the Indian community.
- George Haig Reedy – of Havelock North. For services to people with disabilities and the community.
- Namulau'ulu Taotua Leaoa Joshua James Potoa'e Robertson – of Moturoa. For services to the Pacific community.
- Dr Kenneth Robert Romeril – of Te Aro. For services to haematology.
- Hans Rook – of Tamatea. For services to wildlife conservation.
- Professor Jacinta Arianna Ruru – of Pūrākaunui. For services to Māori and the law.
- Leicester Malcolm Rutledge – of Waikiwi. For services to rugby and the community.
- Rukumoana Tira Marie Schaafhausen – of Karaka. For services to Māori and the community.
- Dr Angela Denise Sharples – of Hamurana. For services to education.
- Rochana Sheward – of New Lynn. For services to the community.
- Gwendoline Smith – of Waterview. For services to mental health.
- Allan Stowers – of Whitford. For services to the Samoan community.
- Kolokesa Uafā Māhina-Tuai – of Ōtāhuhu. For services to cultures and the arts.
- Helen Muriel Tuhoro – of Kawerau. For services to education.
- Frian Percy Wadia – of New Windsor. For services to disability and education.
- John Tahana Ward-Holmes – of Puramāhoi, Tākaka. For services to Māori and conservation.
- Air Commodore Darryn Robert Webb – of Porirua. For services to the New Zealand Defence Force.
- Alan Bruce Whiteman – of Tōtara Park. For services to full-bore target rifle shooting.
- Michele June-Marie Whiting – of Papakōwhai. For services to education.
- Beryl Joan Wilcox – of Invercargill. For services to the community.
- Dr John Douglas Wilson – of Acacia Bay. For services to health and seniors.
- Rosalie Myrtle Martha Wrathall – of Katikati. For services to golf.
- William Richard Wright – of Horahora. For services to conservation.
- Teremoana Yala – of Takapūwāhia. For services to the Cook Islands community
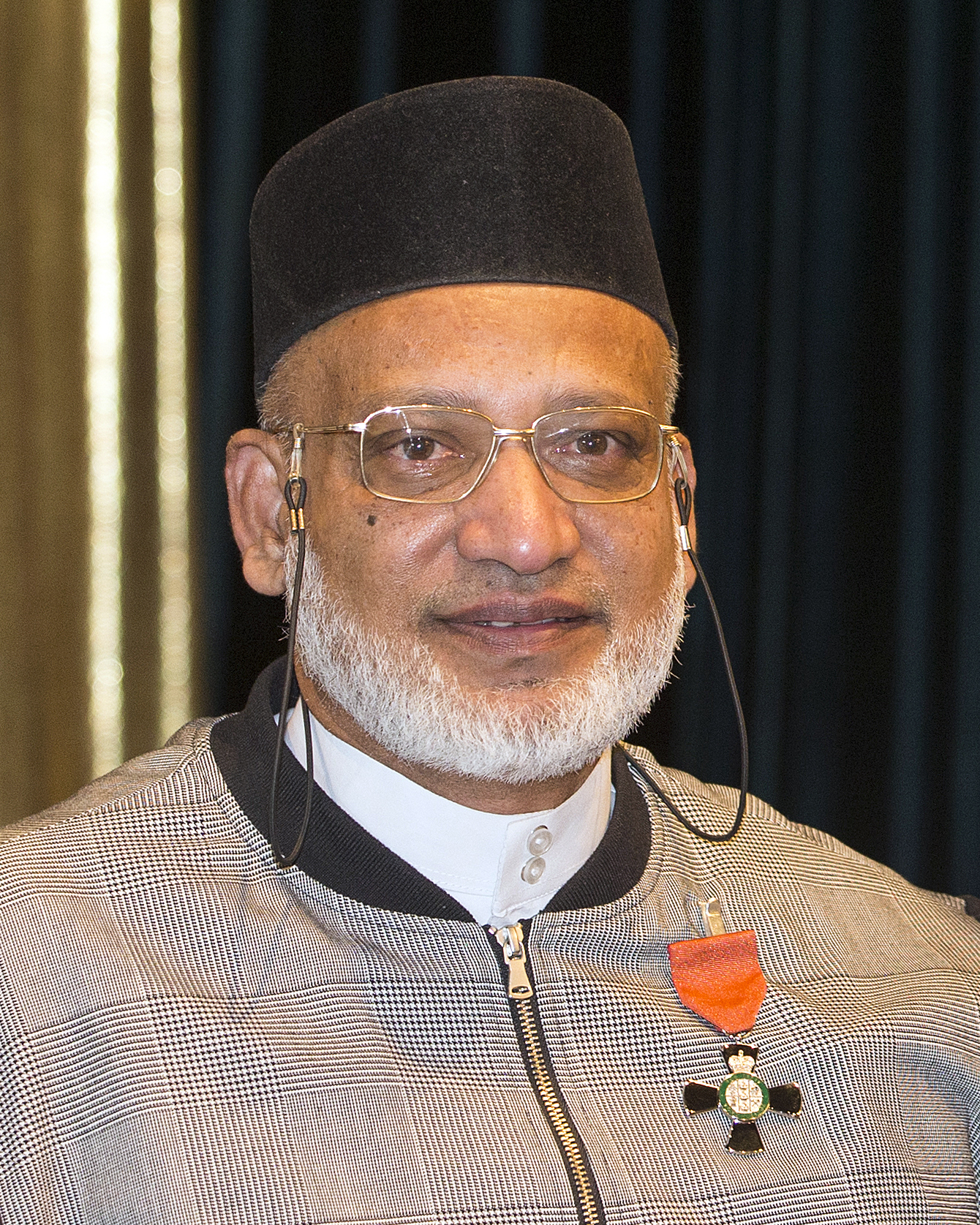
Farid Ahmed

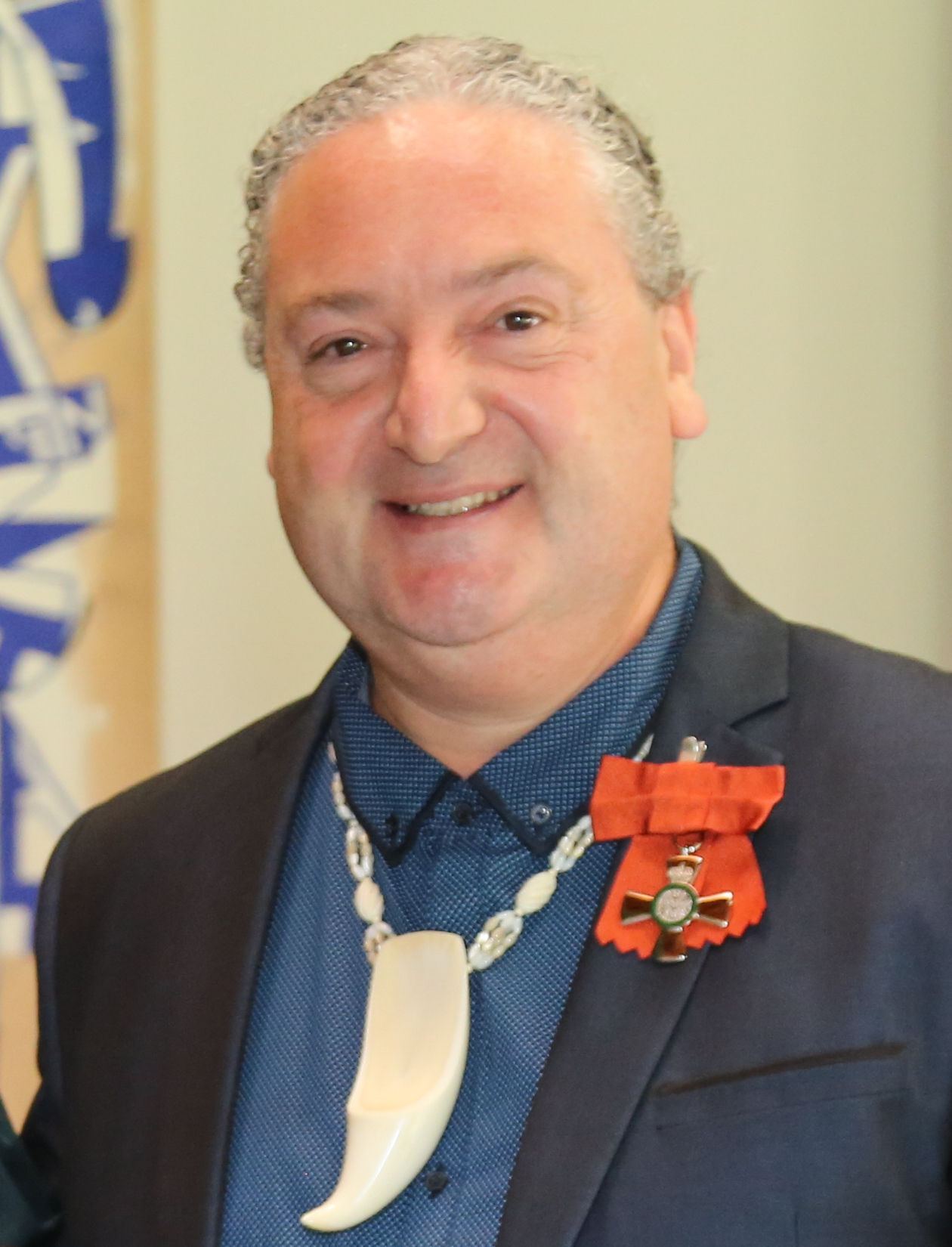
Nigel Borell

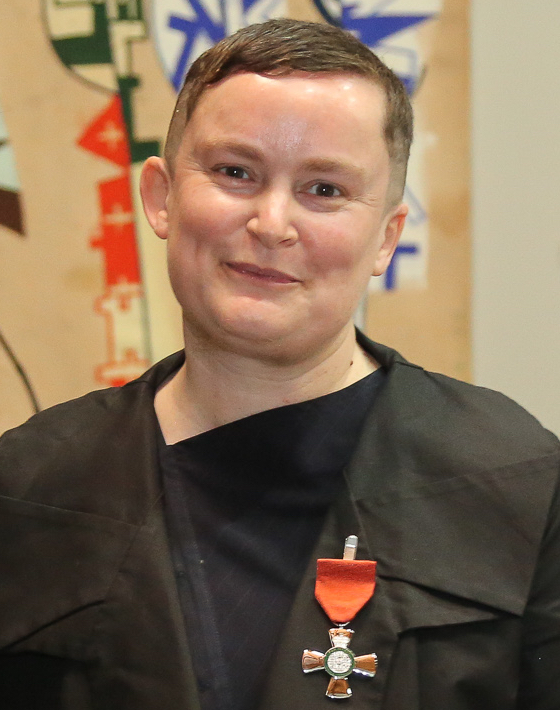
Moira Clunie

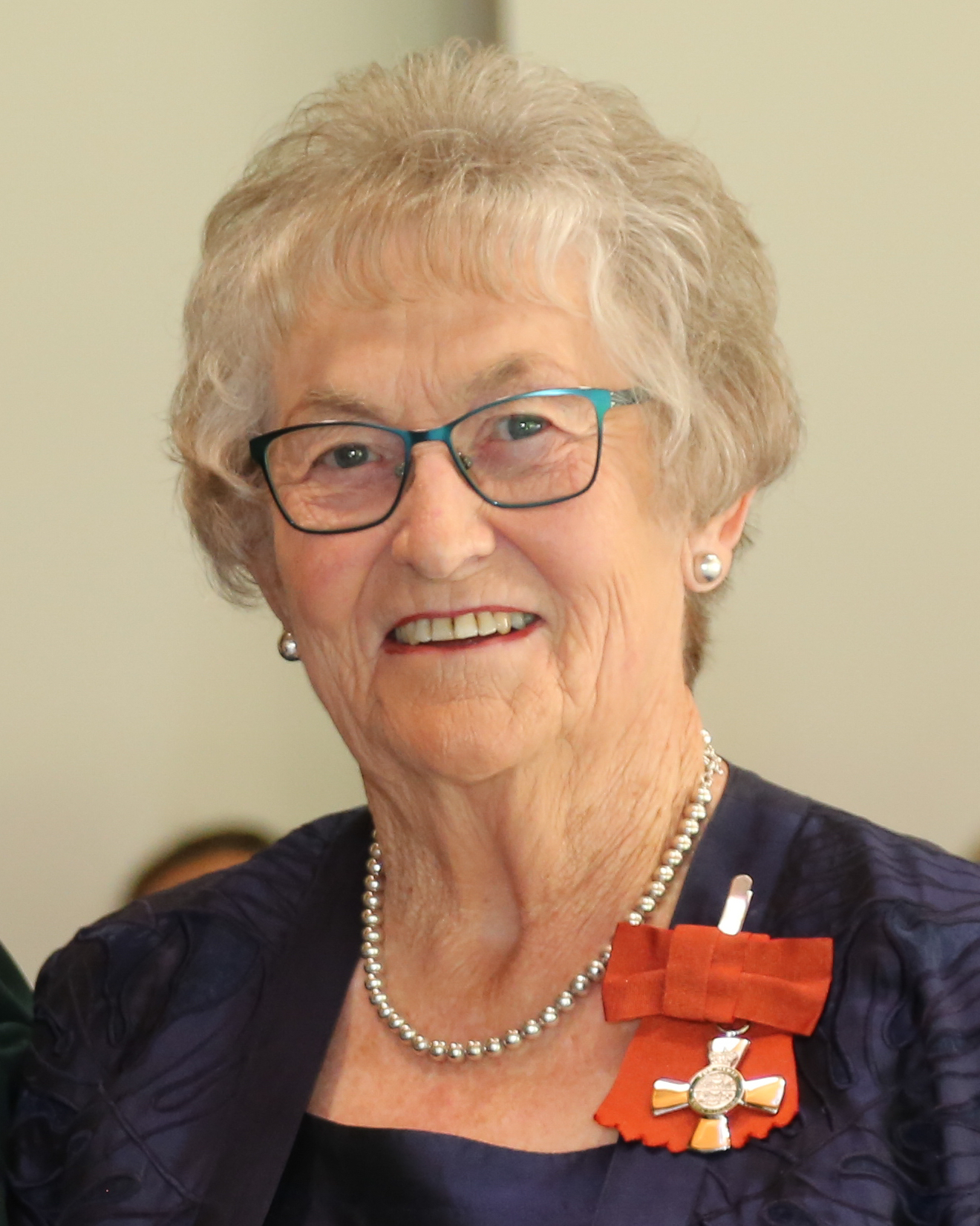
Beverley Douglas

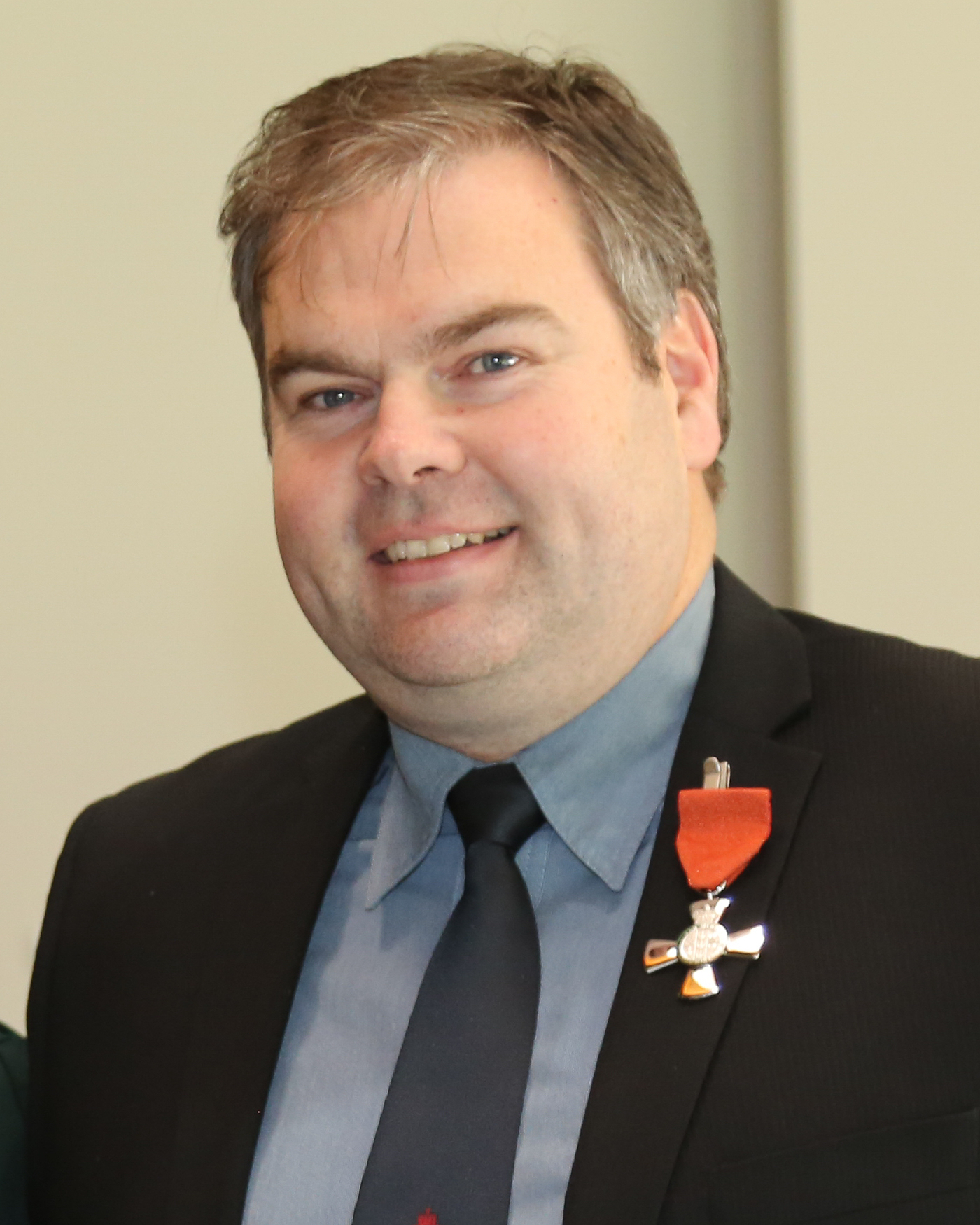
Kevin Evans

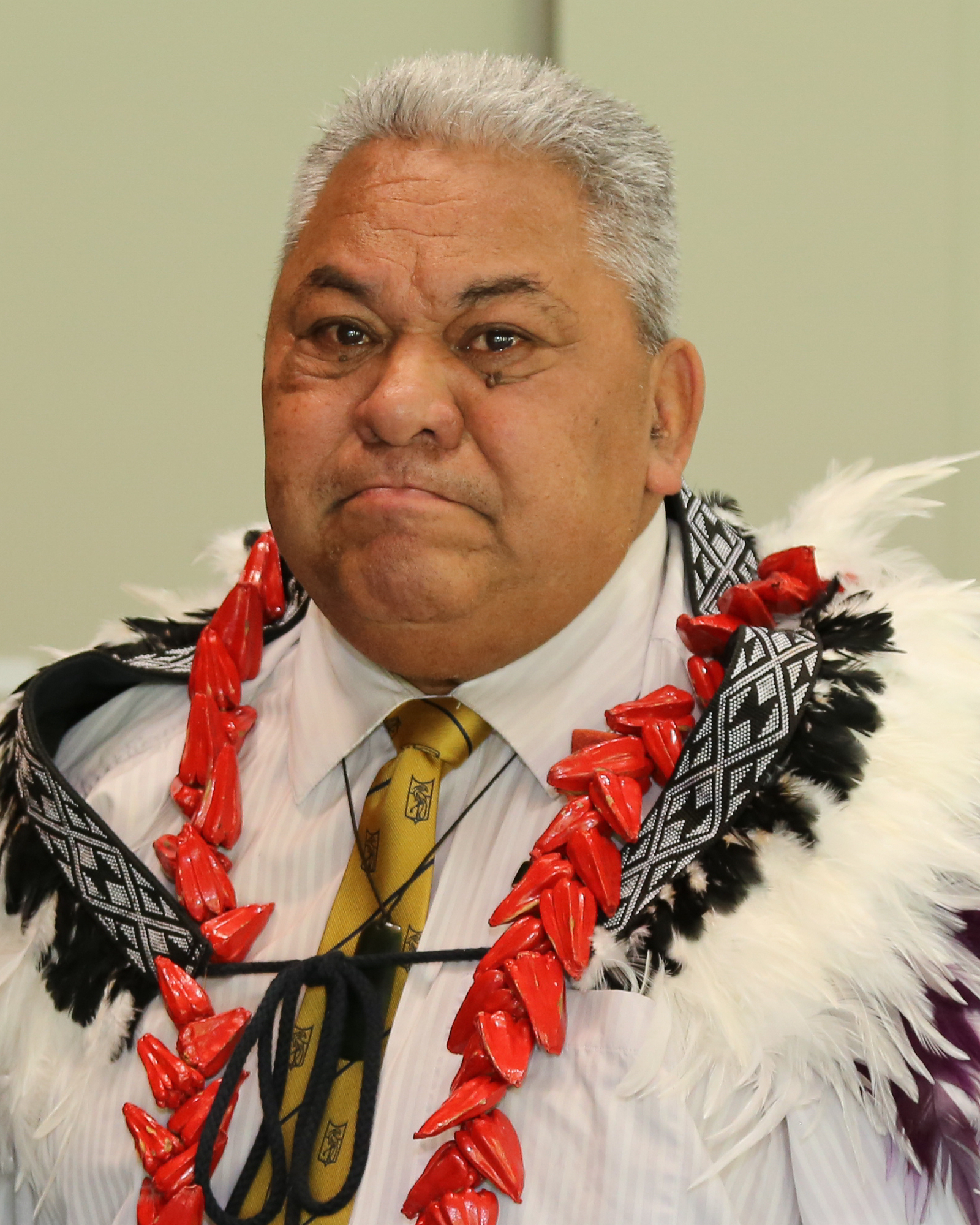
Alf Filipaina

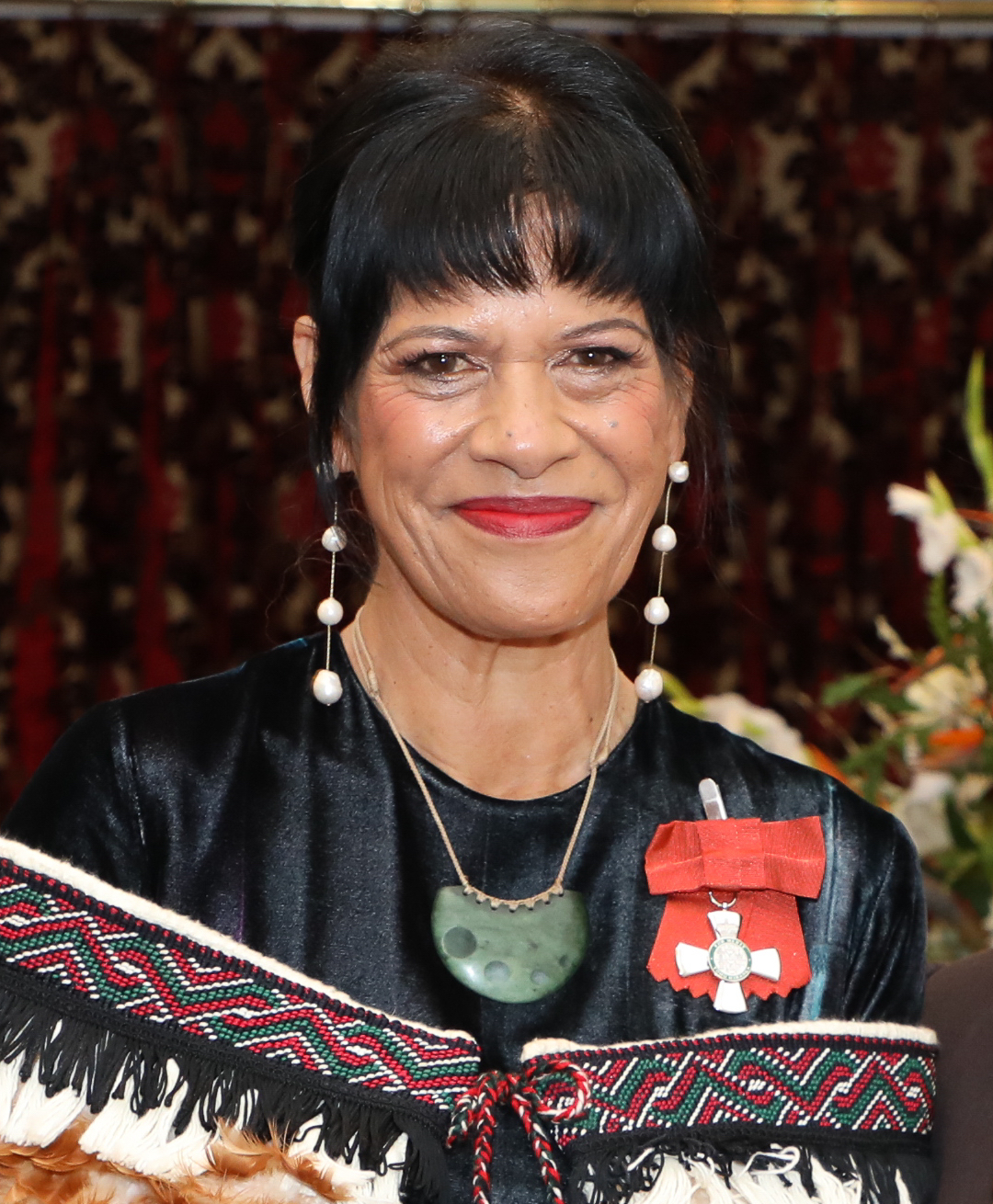
Tanea Heke

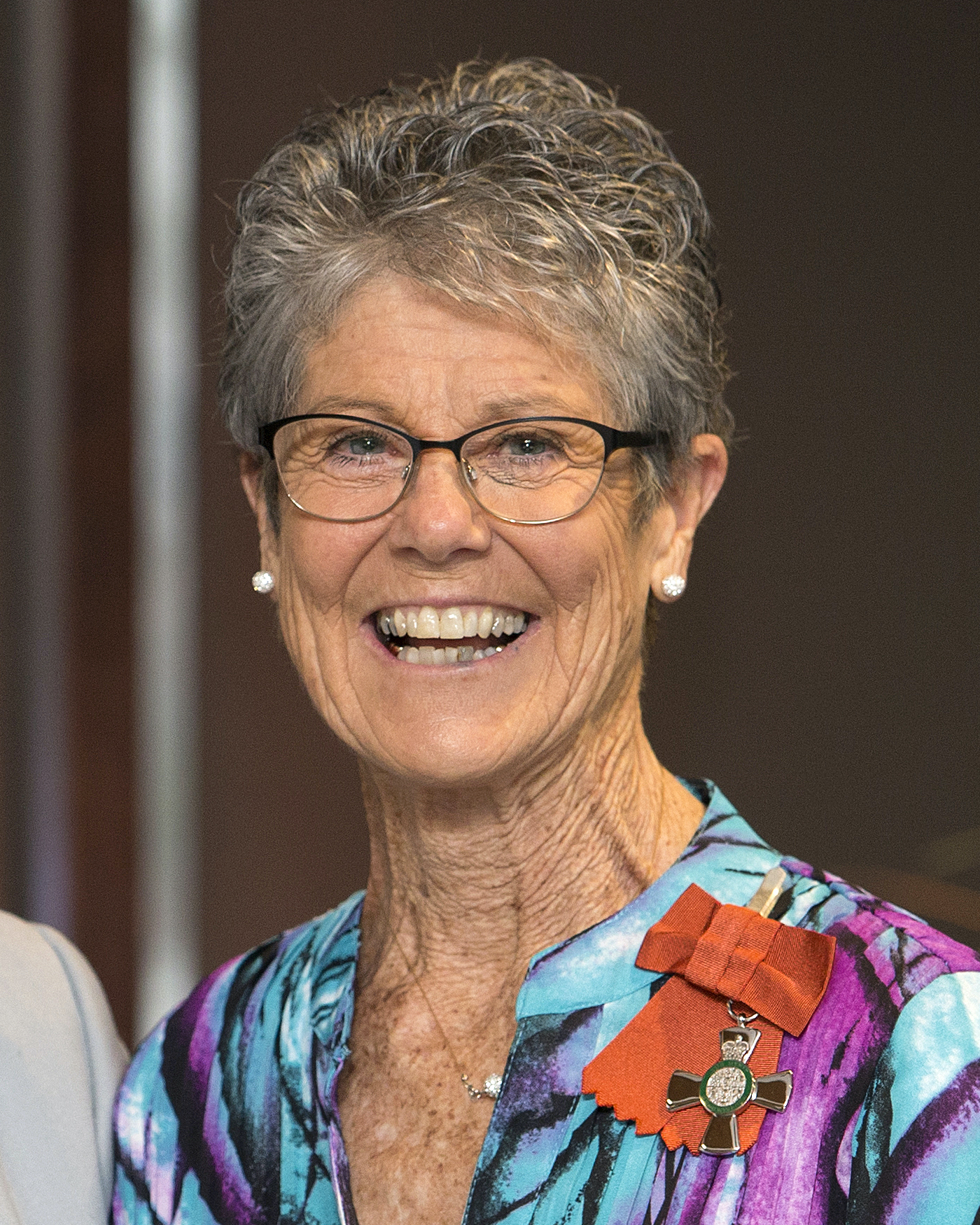
Judi Jessop

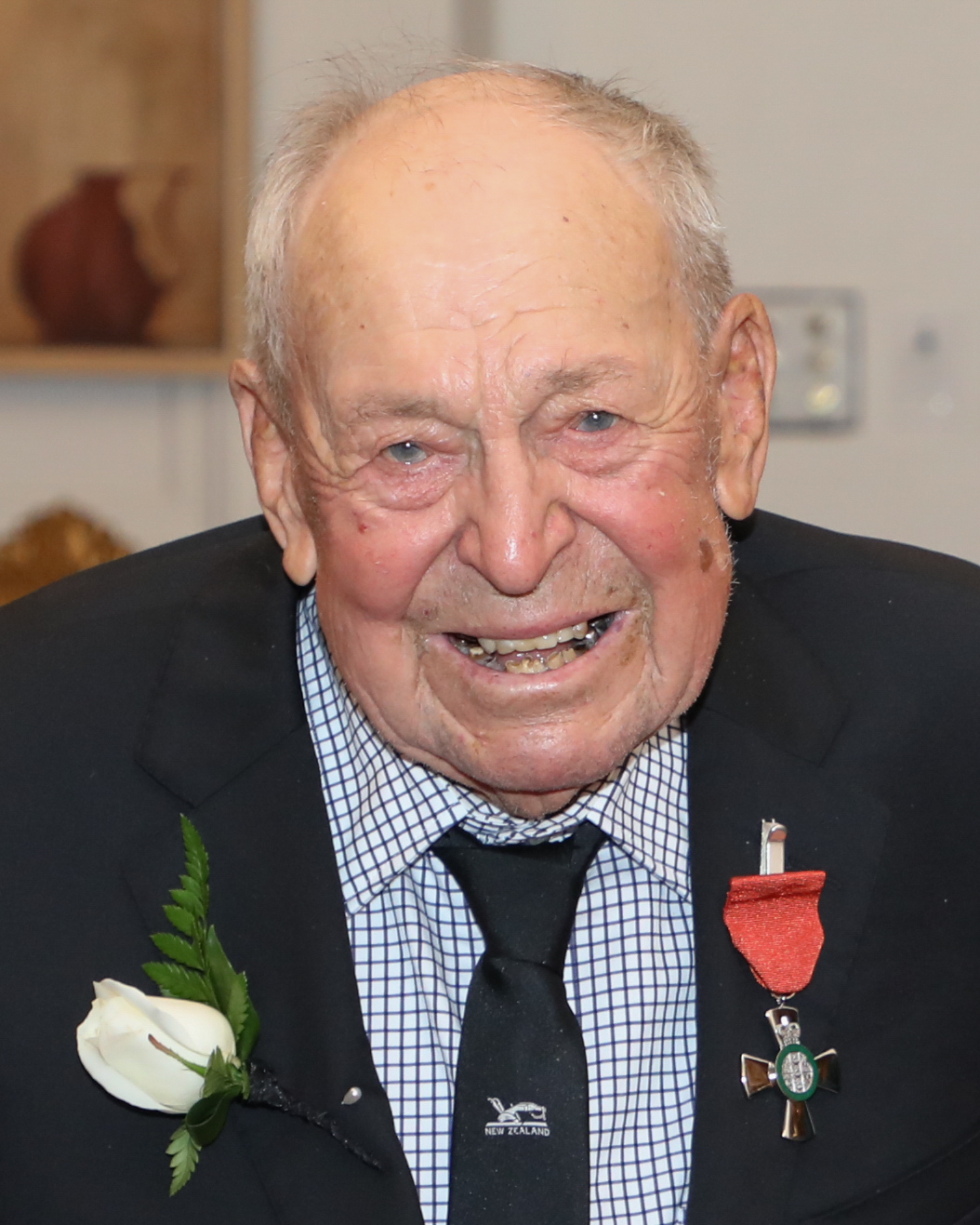
Ian Jordan

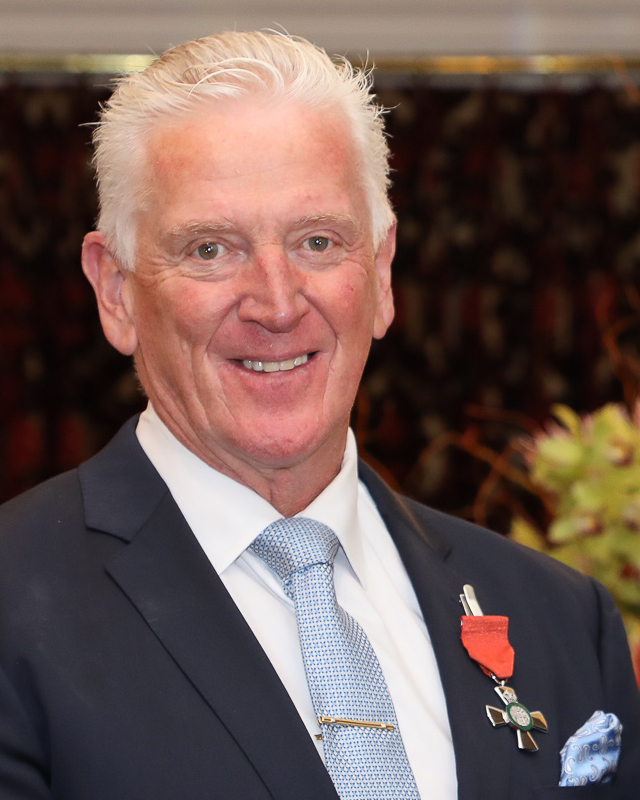
Shane McManaway

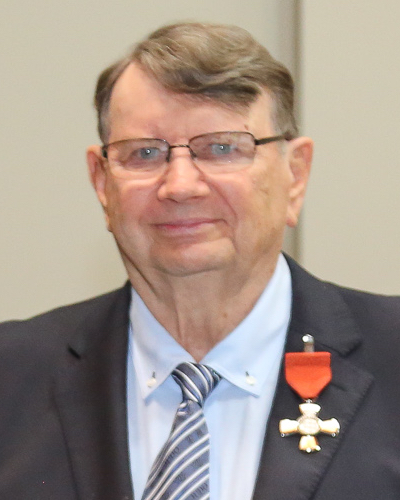
Jim McPhee

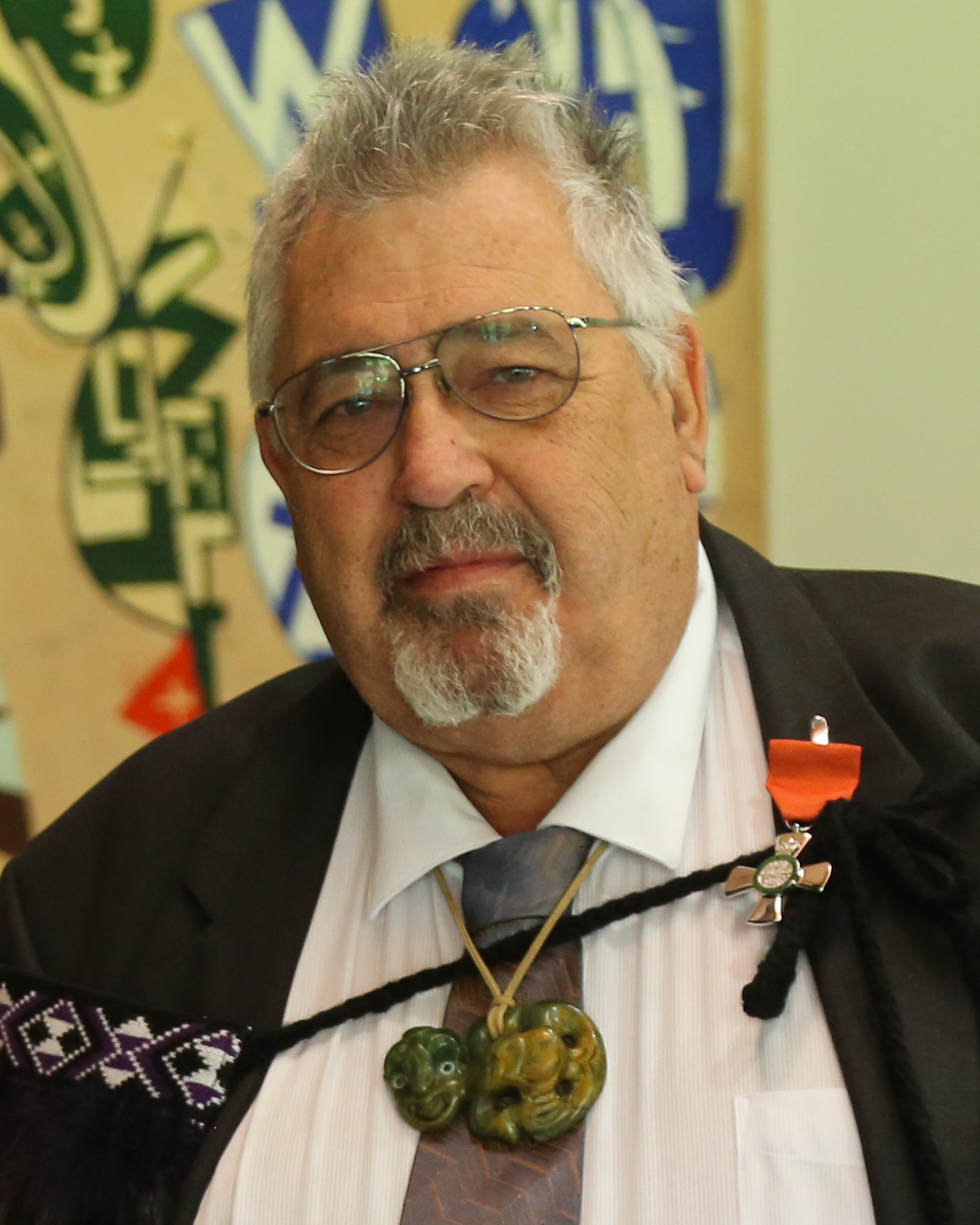
Pat Newman

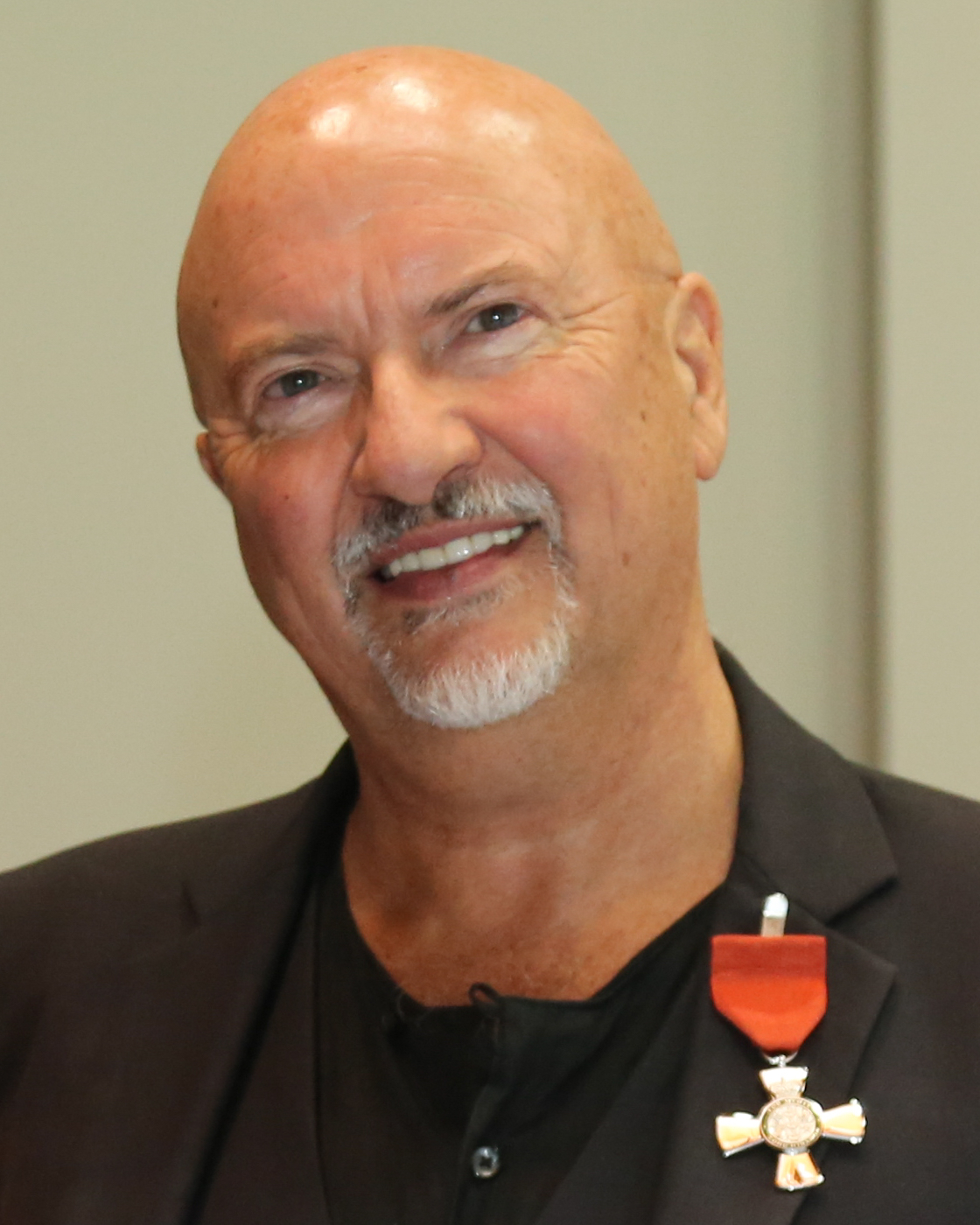
Robert Oliver

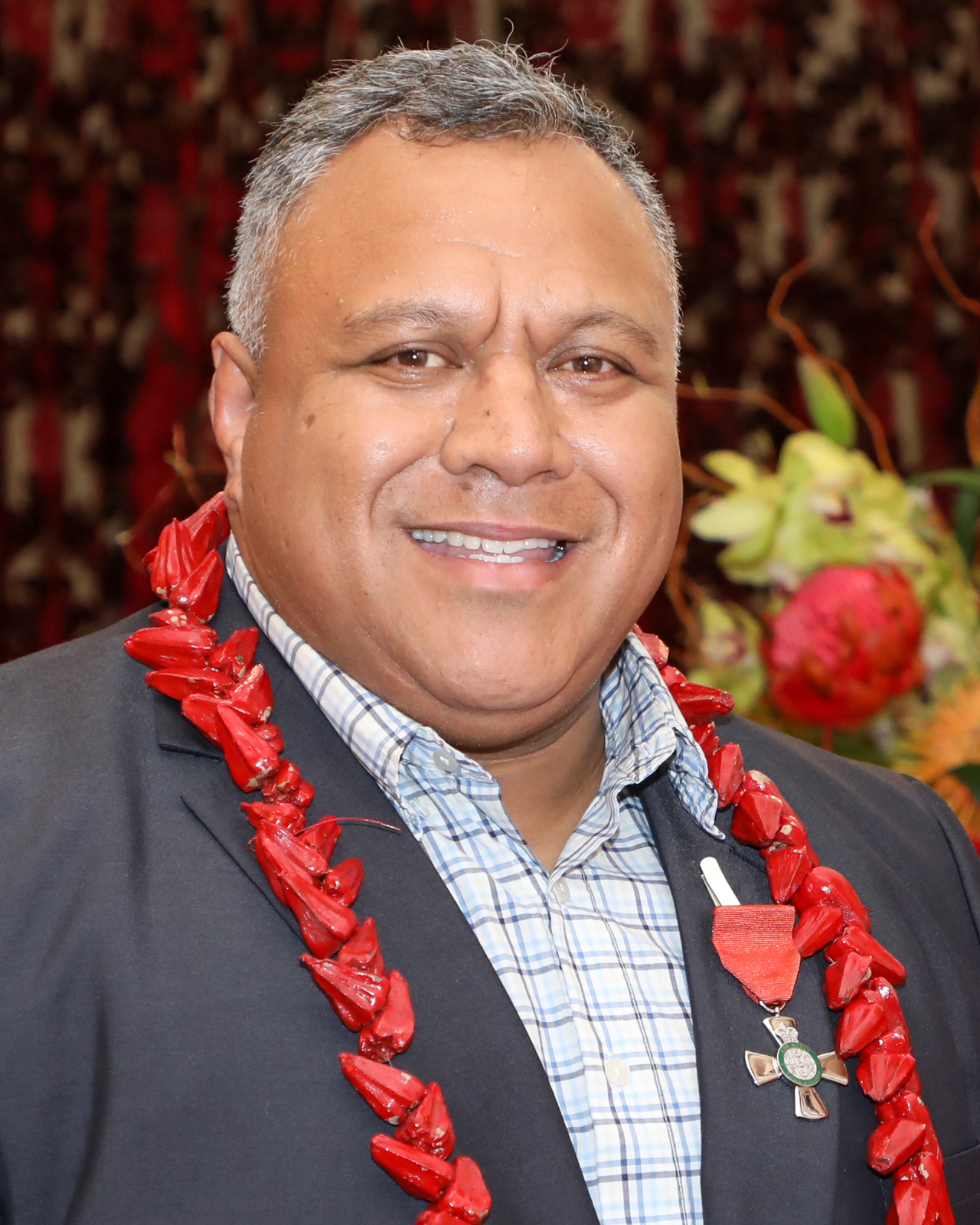
Joshua Robertson

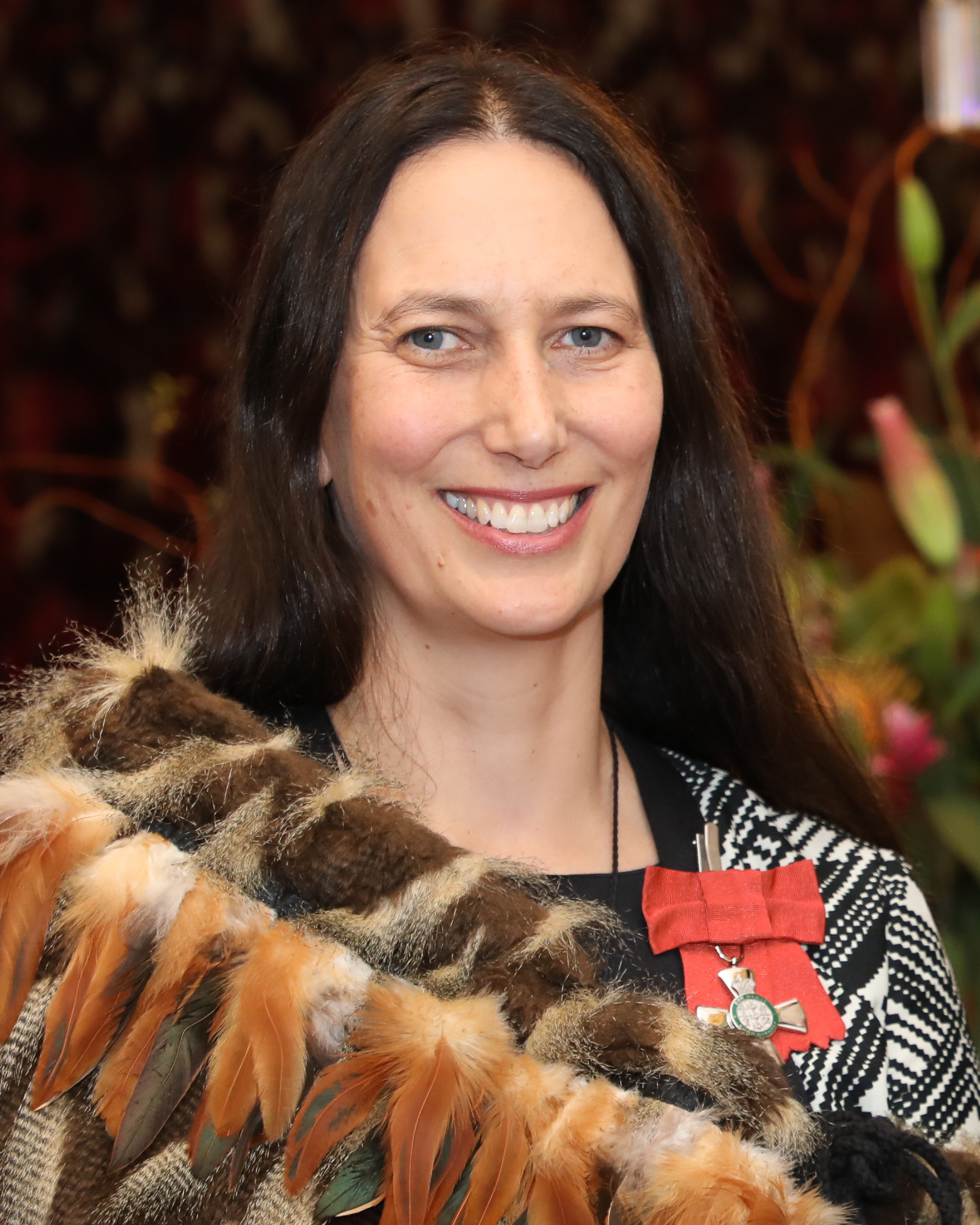
Jacinta Ruru

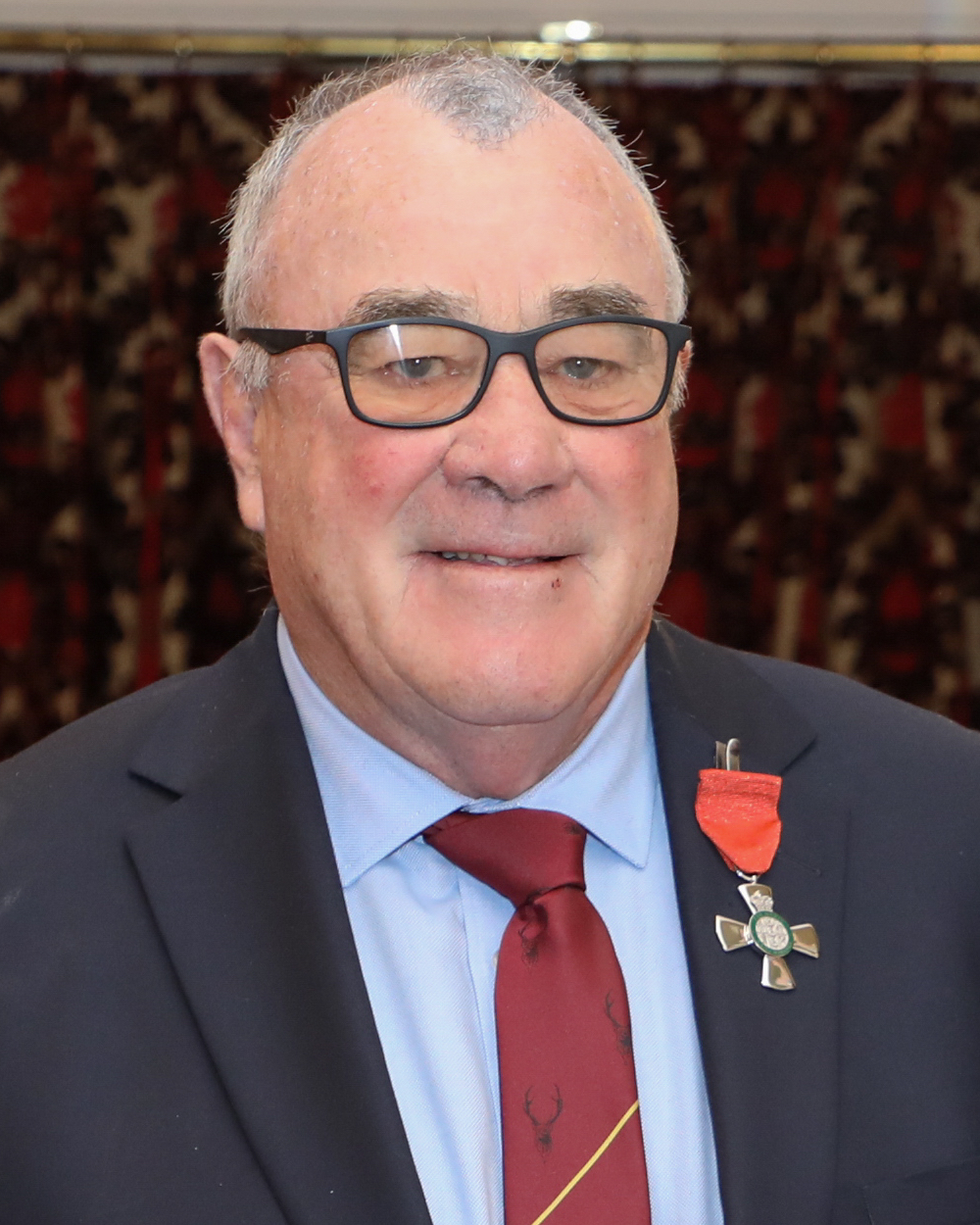
Leicester Rutledge

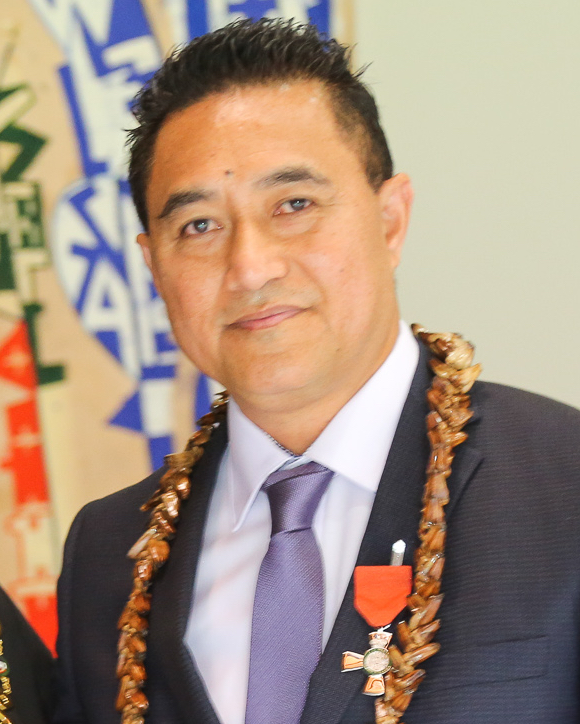
Allan Stowers

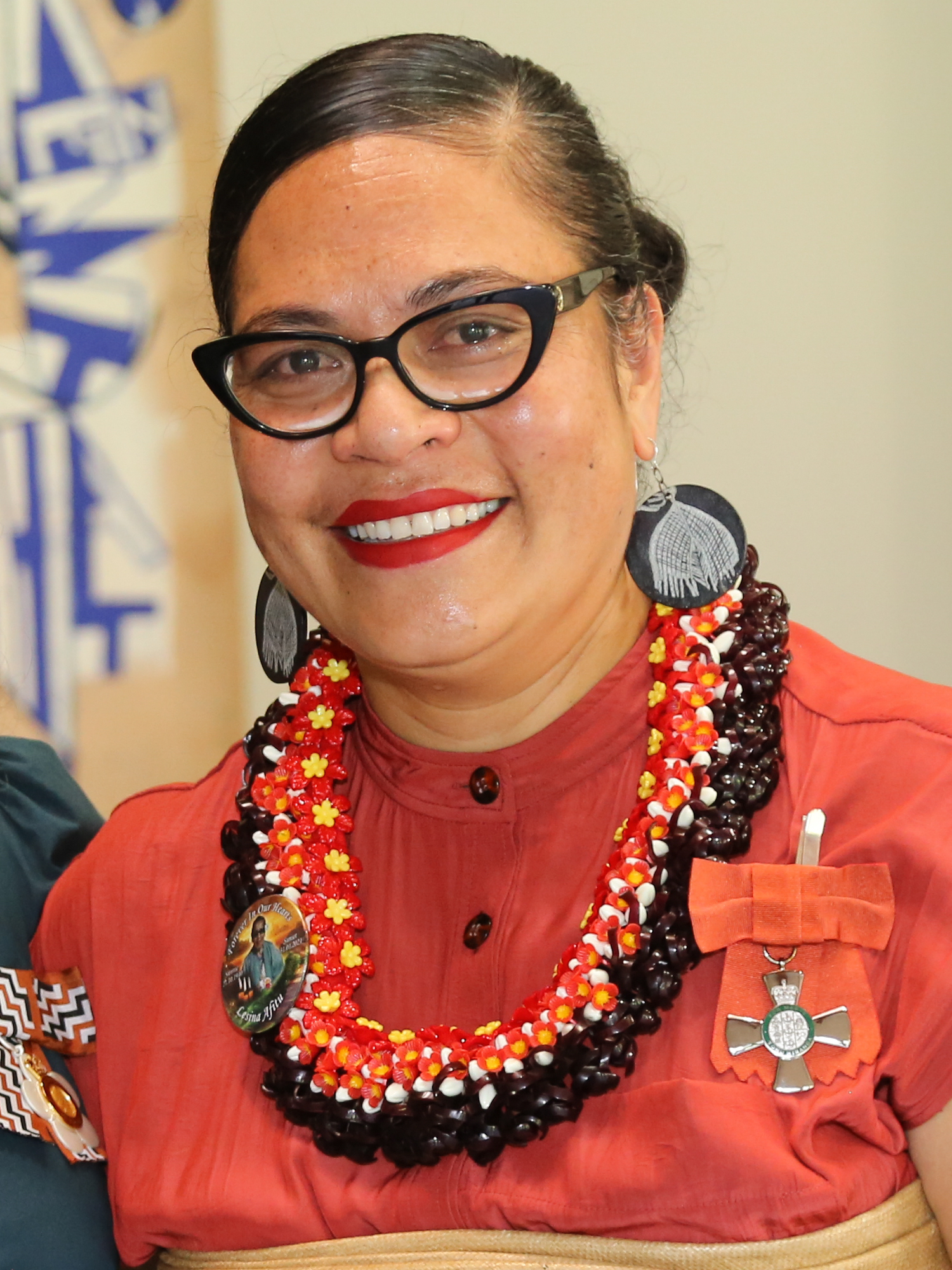
Kolokesa Māhina-Tuai

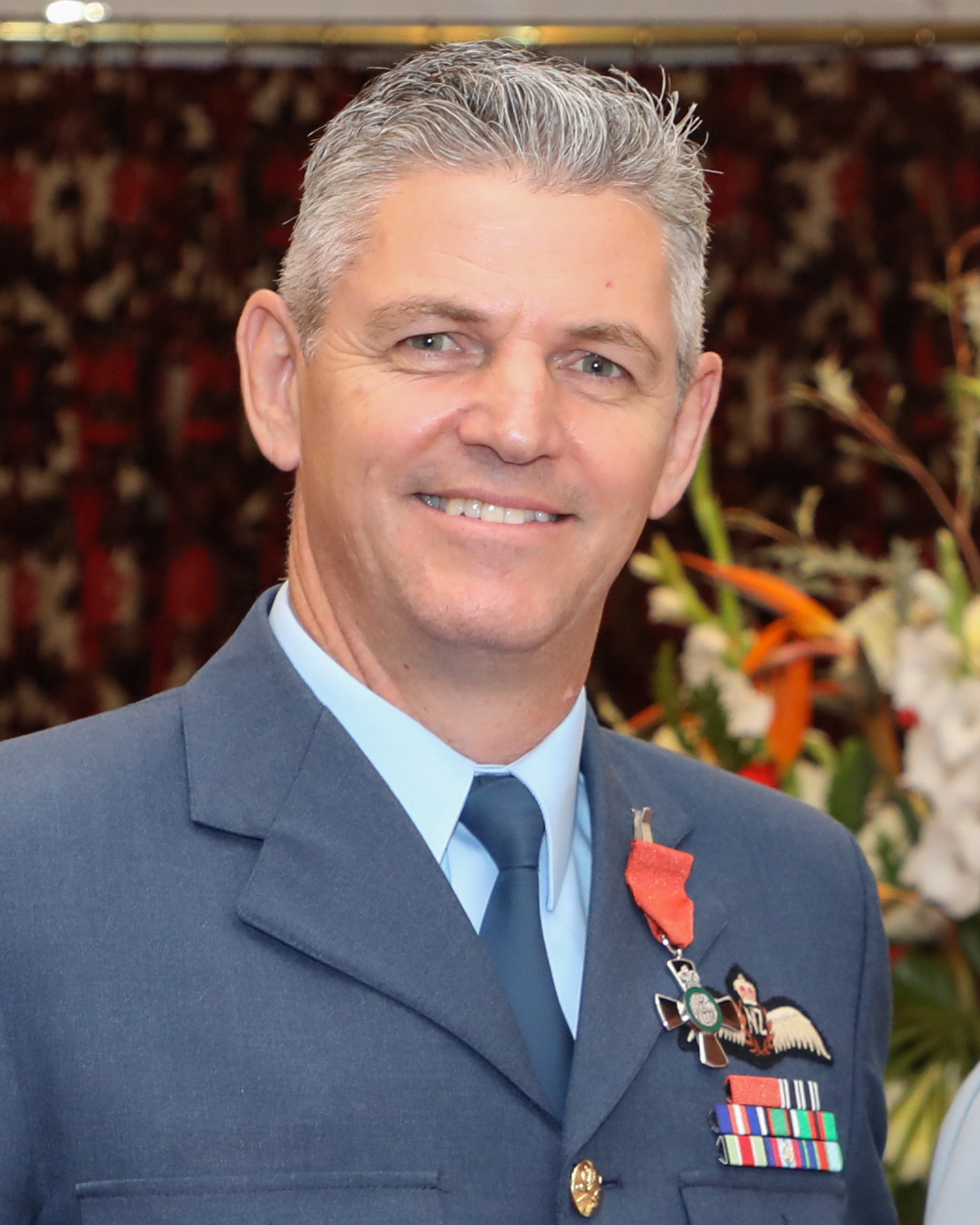
Darryn Webb

== Royal Victorian Order ==
=== Commander (CVO) ===
- The Right Honourable Dame Patricia Lee Reddy GNZM QSO – lately governor-general.
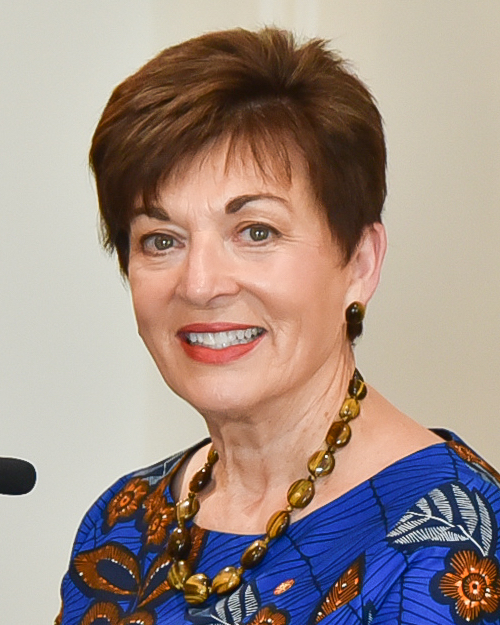
Dame Patsy Reddy

== Companion of the Queen's Service Order (QSO) ==
- The Honourable Stephanie (Steve) Anne Chadwick – of Glenholme. For services to local government and as a Member of Parliament.
- Kenneth James Durbin – of Birkenhead. For services to the community and youth.
- Margaret Ann Hartley JP – of Beach Haven. For services to local government and the community.
- Lewis Vernon Sanson NZAM – of Wānaka. For services to conservation and public service.
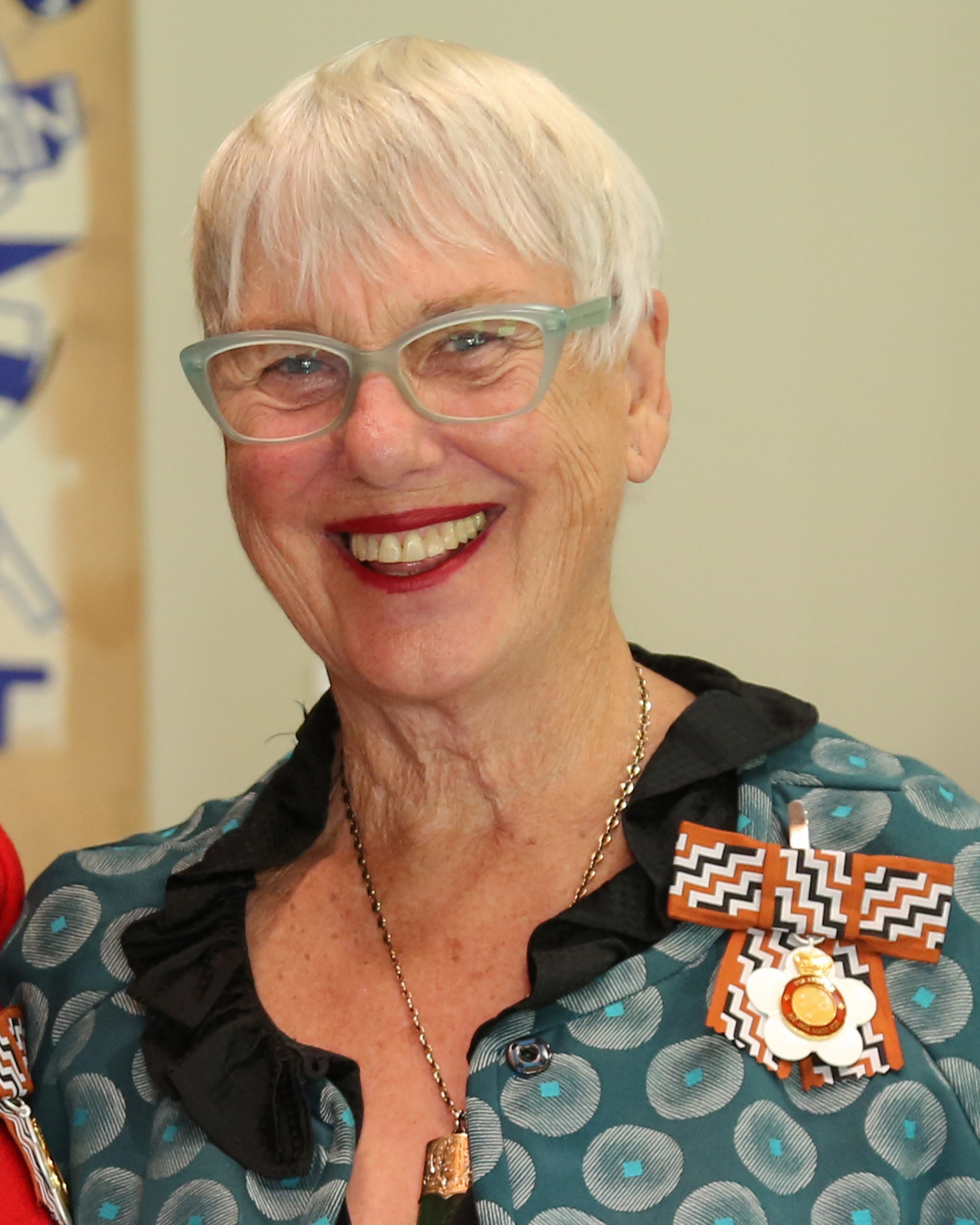
Steve Chadwick

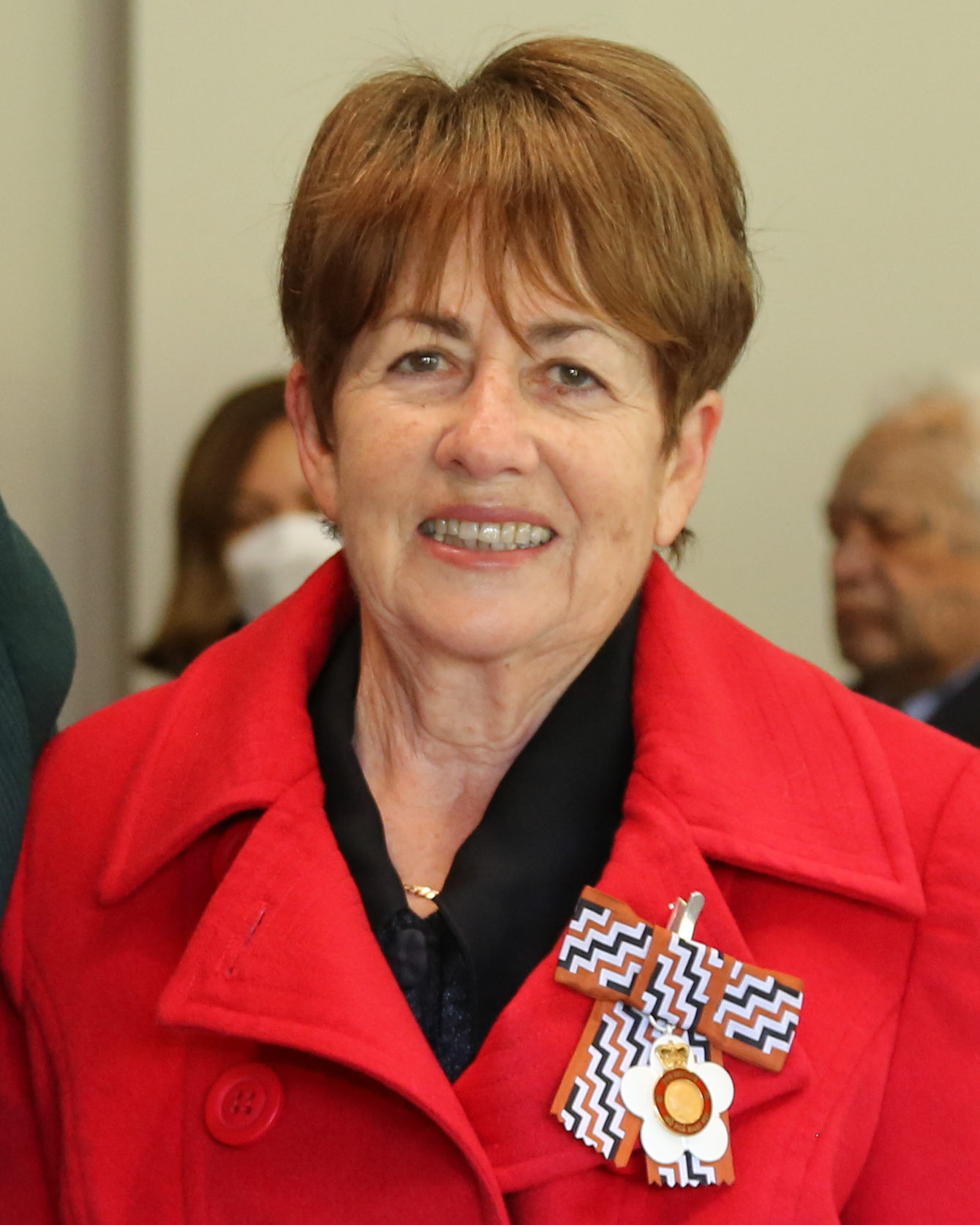
Ann Hartley

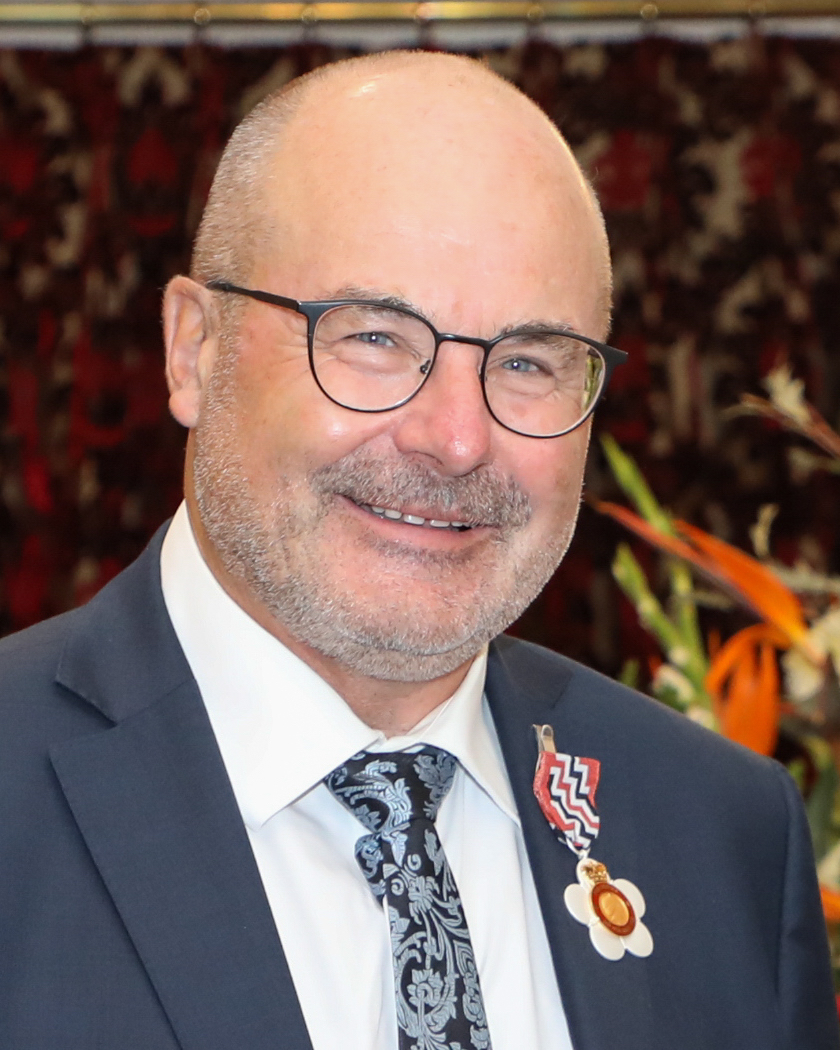
Lou Sanson

== Queen's Service Medal (QSM) ==
- Jennifer Agnew – of Papanui. For services to historical research and the Chinese community.
- Trevor Gordon Agnew – of Papanui. For services to children's literacy and historical research.
- Nonu 'Unga Alatini – of Ōtara. For services to the Tongan community and education.
- Robyn Baldwin – of Watlington. For services to seniors.
- Aart Brusse – of Waverley, Dunedin. For services to music.
- David John Bullock – of Leeston. For services to bowls administration.
- Lynley Ann Bunton – of Roslyn. For services to education and the community.
- Peter Powles Caccia-Birch – of Snells Beach. For services to the community.
- Keith Raynor Carter – of Greerton. For services to the community.
- Gina Blaize Chaffey-Aupouri – of Ruatoria. For services to Māori.
- John Lawrence Cocking – of Marewa. For services to theatre and the community.
- Glenn Graeme Cockroft – of Otatara. For services to traffic safety.
- Claire Annette Eyes – of Pukekohe. For services to midwifery.
- Hazel Beatrice Georgantis – of Hilltop. For services to the community.
- Ina Mary Hansen – of Wellington Central. For services to rugby and education.
- William Mervyn Harris – of Clinton. For services to Fire and Emergency New Zealand and the community.
- Brenda Mary Hayes – of Richmond, Christchurch. For services to theatre.
- David Dennis Hinman – of St Albans. For services to tramways and heritage.
- Thomas Edward Howard – of Kaikōura. For services to conservation, particularly wildlife conservation.
- Alan Wayne Kissell – of Stoke. For services to the community.
- Catherine Mary Knight JP – of Richmond. For services to the community.
- Jacinta Maria Krefft – of Waikanae Beach. For services to youth.
- Jillian Meryl Lord – of Strowan, Christchurch. For services to genealogy.
- Coral Ann Macdonald – of Silverstream. For services to floristry.
- Alistair Donald MacDougall – of Waikanae Beach. For services to the community.
- Vaisamoa Manoa – of Avondale. For services to the Tuvalu community.
- Wayne Calven Martin – of Kawakawa. For services to Fire and Emergency New Zealand.
- Ailsa Diane McGilvary (Ailsa McGilvary-Howard) – of Kaikōura. For services to conservation, particularly wildlife conservation.
- Gloria Elaine McHutchon – of Edievale. For services to the community.
- Ernest Ryburn Meyer – of One Tree Hill. For services to the community and education.
- Maureen Stuart Meyer – of One Tree Hill. For services to the community.
- Reverend Canon Ihipera (Bella) Waikare Morrell – of St Clair. For services to the Māori language and community.
- Irene Edith Mosley – of Mosgiel. For services to the community.
- Janet Elinor Oakley – of Three Kings. For services to the community and the arts.
- Yvonne Margaret O'Dowd – of Carterton. For services to the community.
- Taulapu Oliver JP – of Islington, Blenheim. For services to the Pacific community.
- Glorious Marie Oxenham – of Belmont. For services to the Melanesian community.
- Jane Painter – of Kamo. For services to the community.
- Nicholas David Perrin – of Wilton. For services to historical research.
- Nigel Ernest Perry – of Redwoodtown. For services to tennis and table tennis.
- Jan Maree Rutledge – of Beach Haven. For services to transitional housing.
- Sandra Maree Spier – of Taihape. For services to health and the community.
- Alison Rosemary Stanes – of Remuera. For services to the environment.
- Garry Manson Taylor – of Katikati. For services to the community and philanthropy.
- Kevin Manson Taylor – of Katikati. For services to the community and philanthropy.
- Ingi Kulesa Sale Tusini-Rex – of Clover Park. For services to the Niue community.
- Brian William Vincent – of Ōpunake. For services to Fire and Emergency New Zealand and the community.
- Noeline Ann Watson – of Cromwell. For services to the community.
- Paul Henry Wilkins – of Murchison. For services to Fire and Emergency New Zealand the community.
- John David Thomas Williamson – of Maunu. For services to the community.

Honorary

- Jessica Wim Geertje Buddendijk – of Mount Wellington. For services to the aged care sector.
- Tito Daurewa – of Papatoetoe. For services to the Pacific community and Pacific rugby.
- Falanisesi Fusitu'a Hafoka – of Point England. For services to the Tongan community
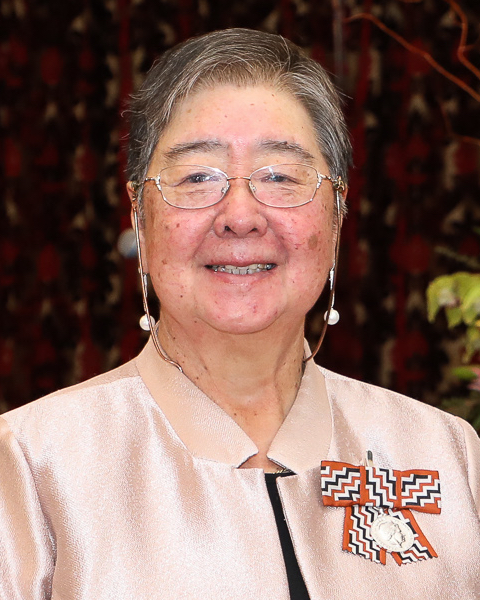
Jenny Agnew

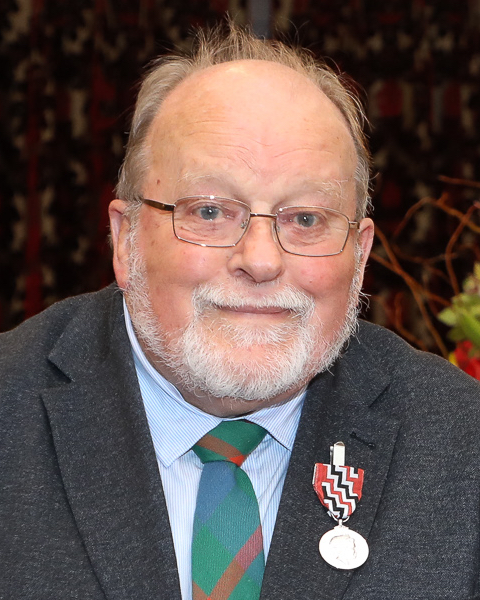
Trevor Agnew

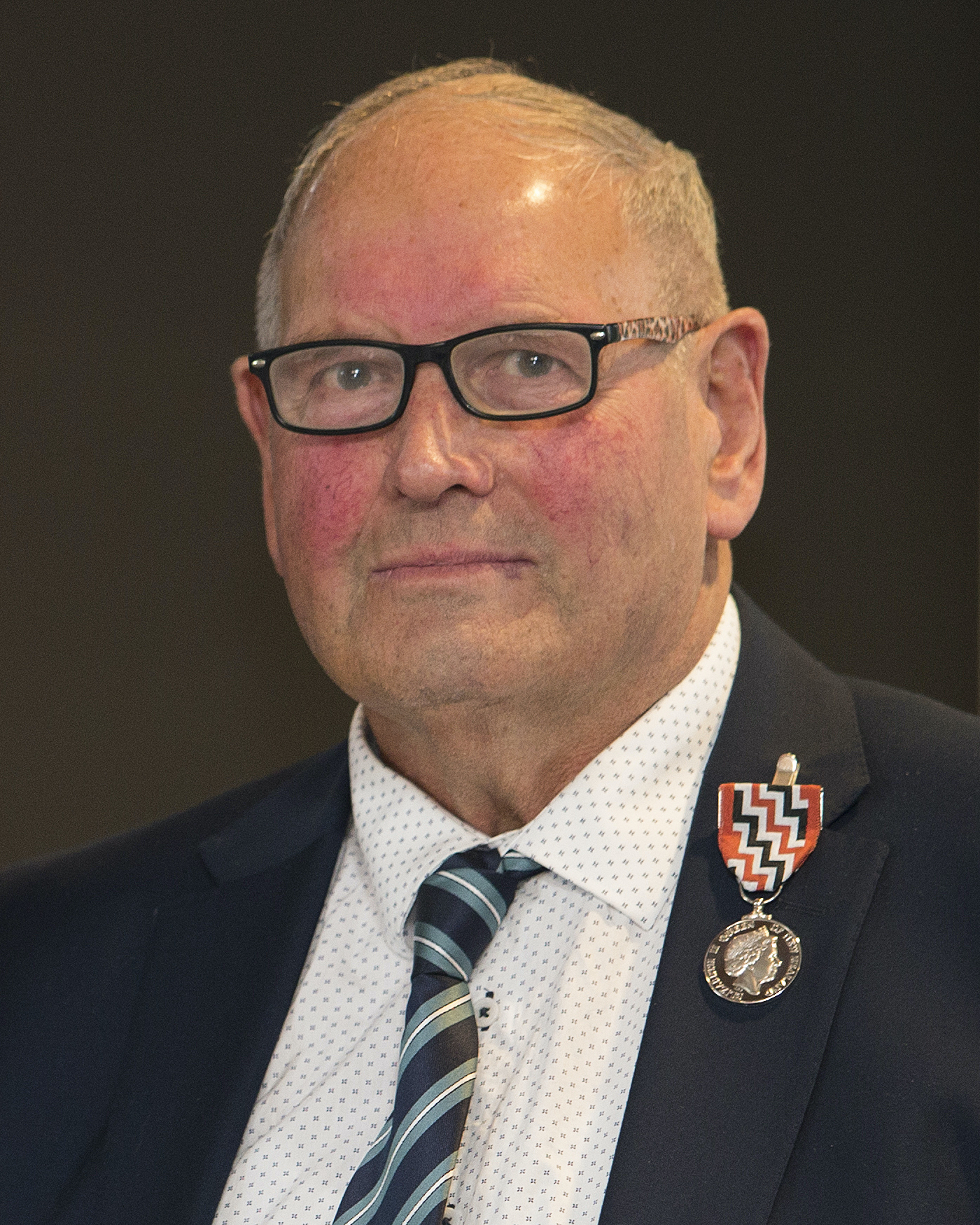
David Bullock

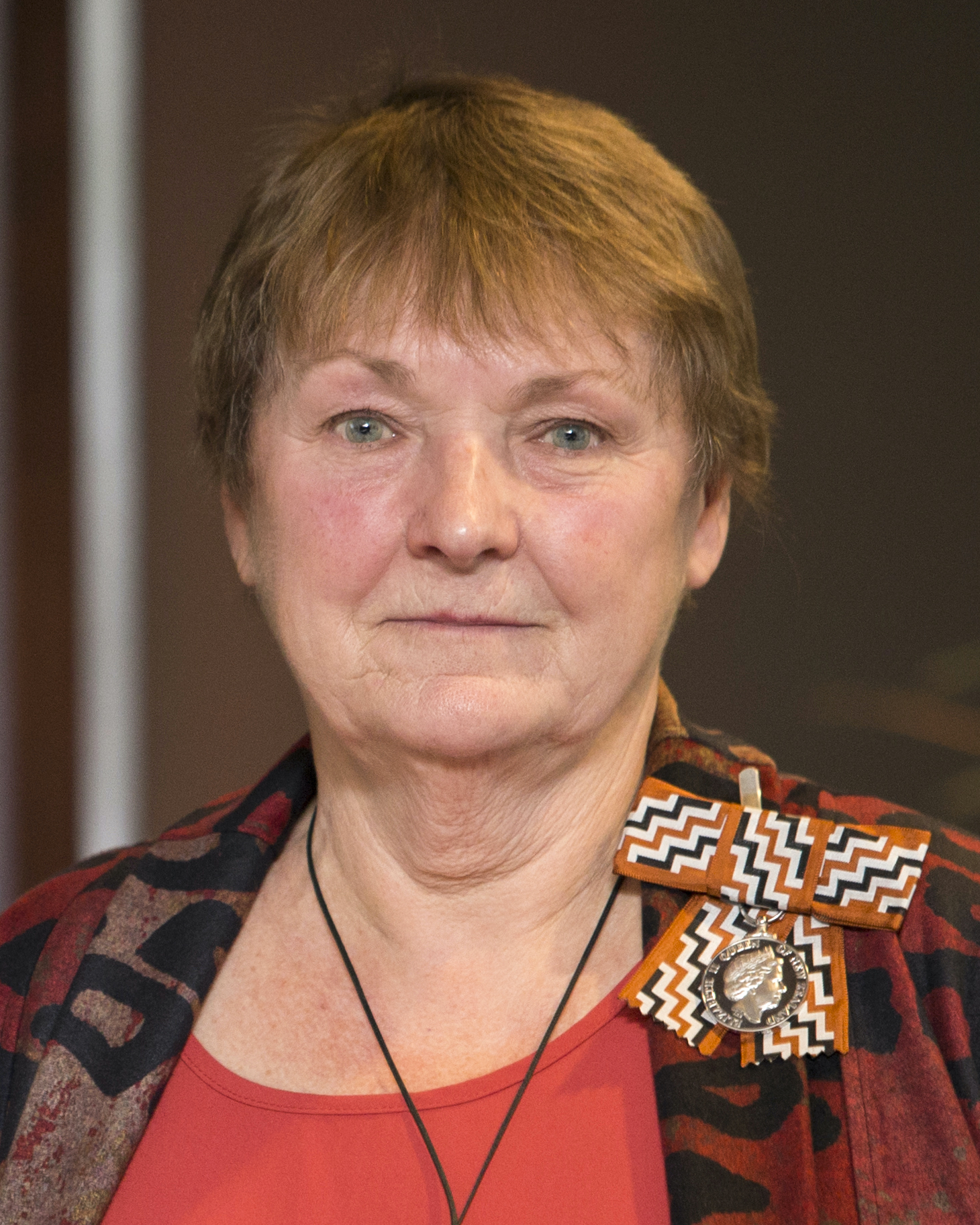
Brenda Hayes

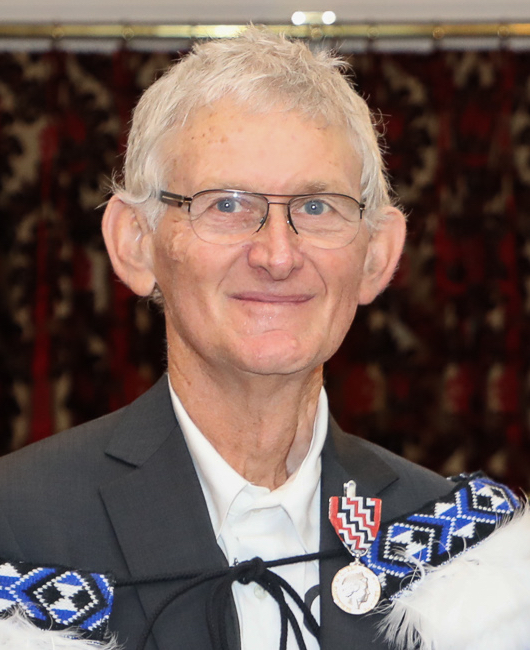
Ted Howard

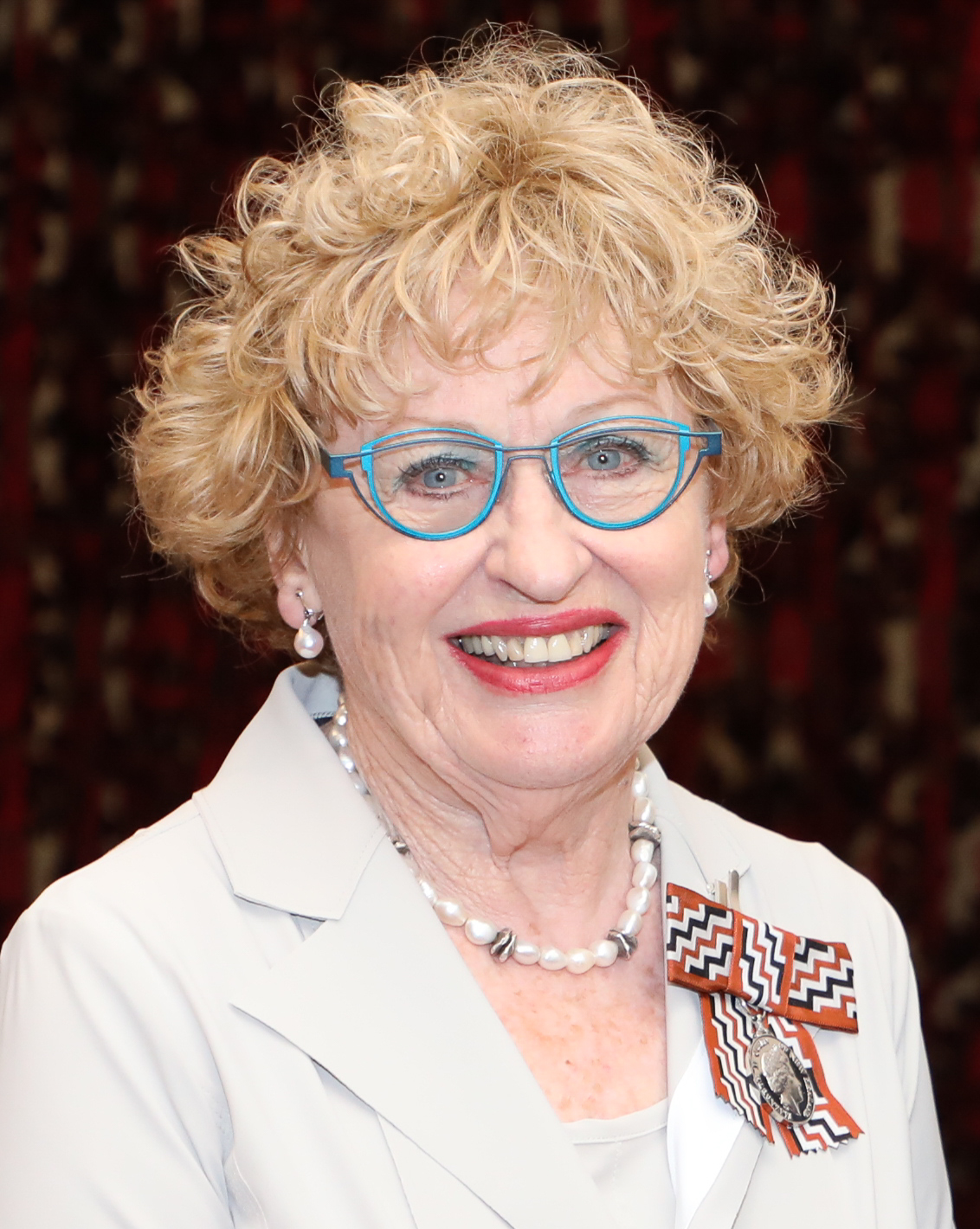
Jill Lord

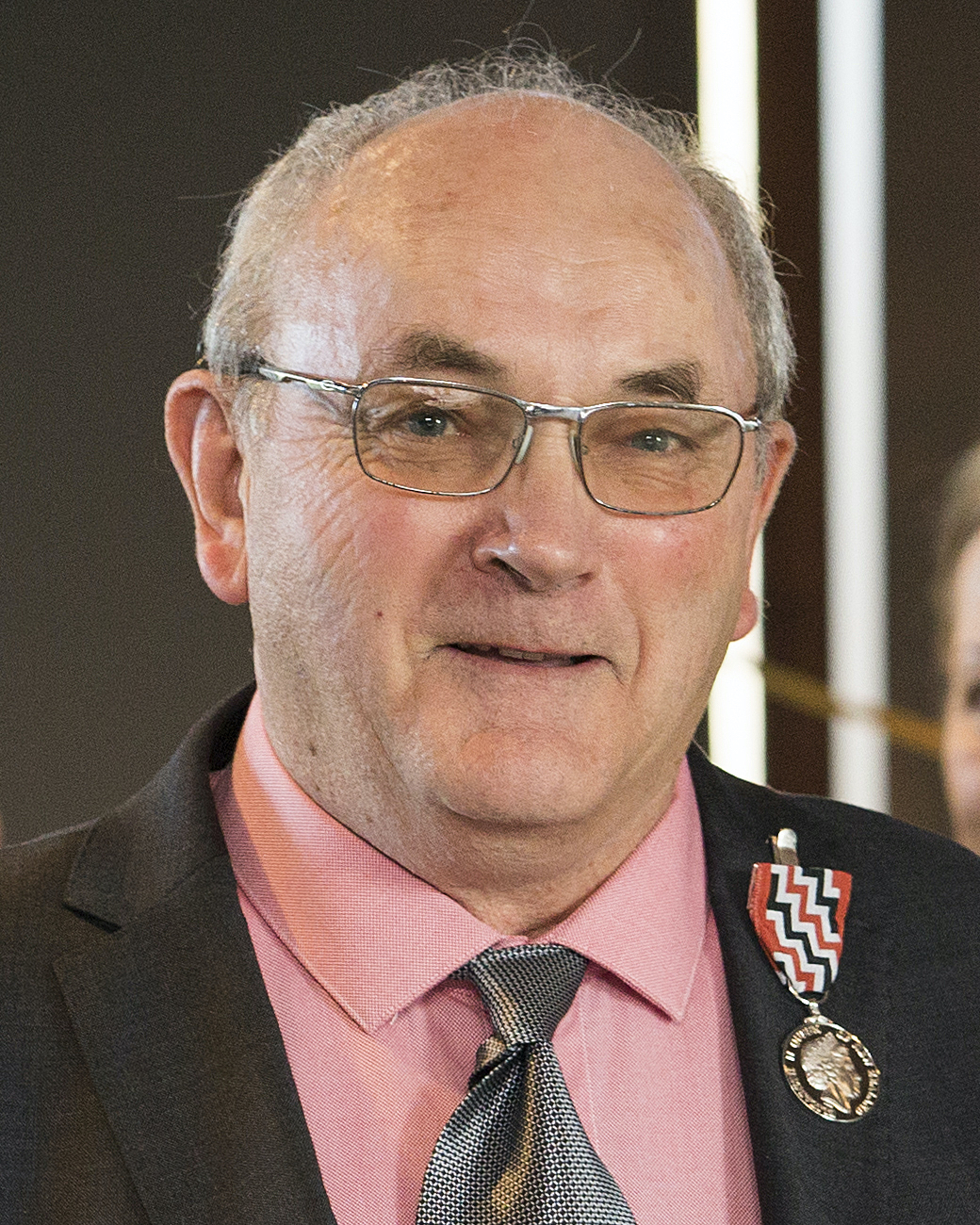
Alan Kissell

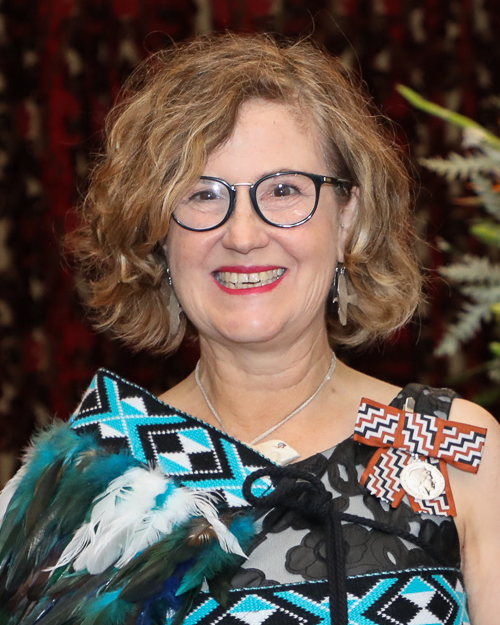
Ailsa McGilvary

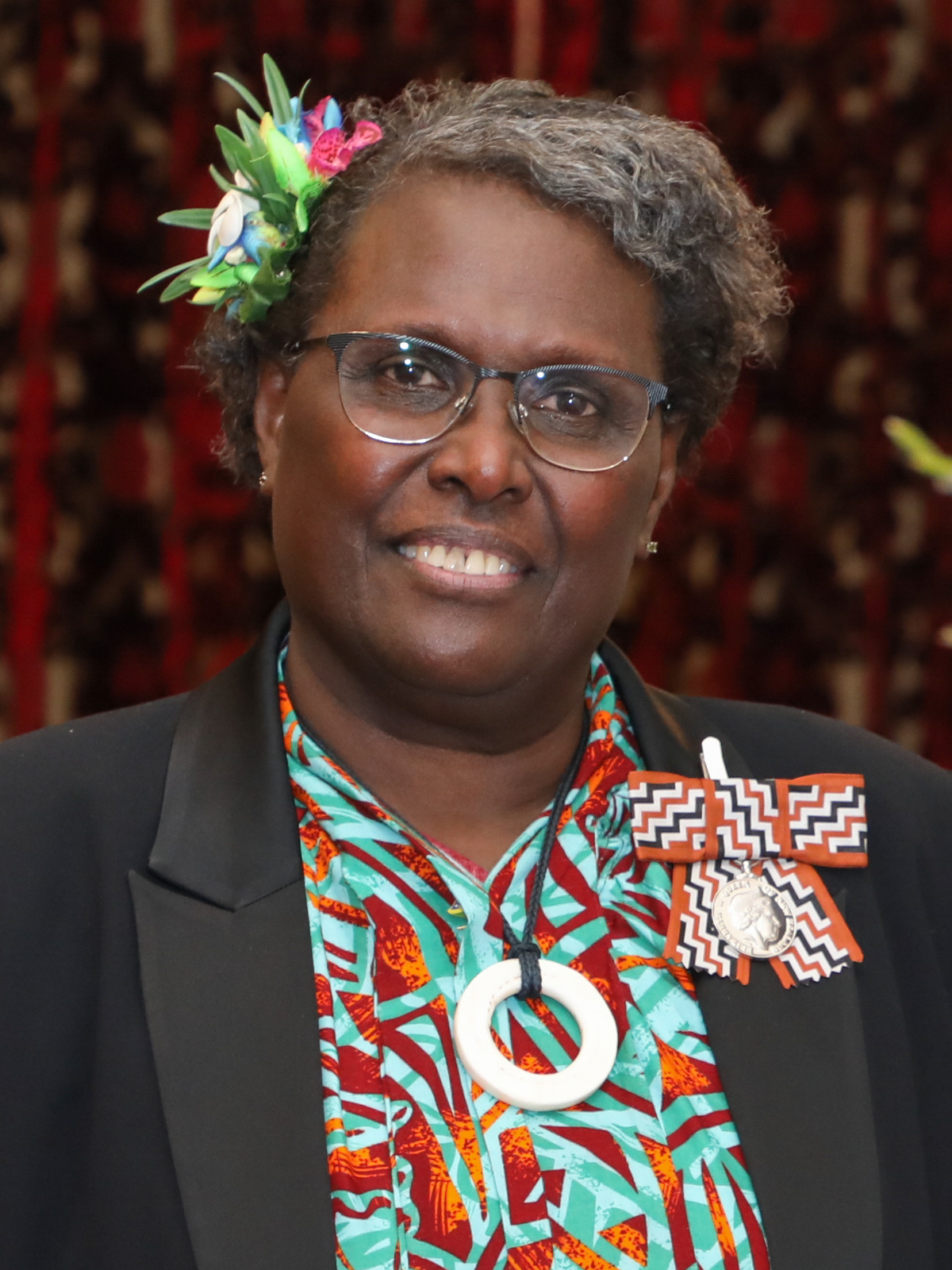
Glo Oxenham

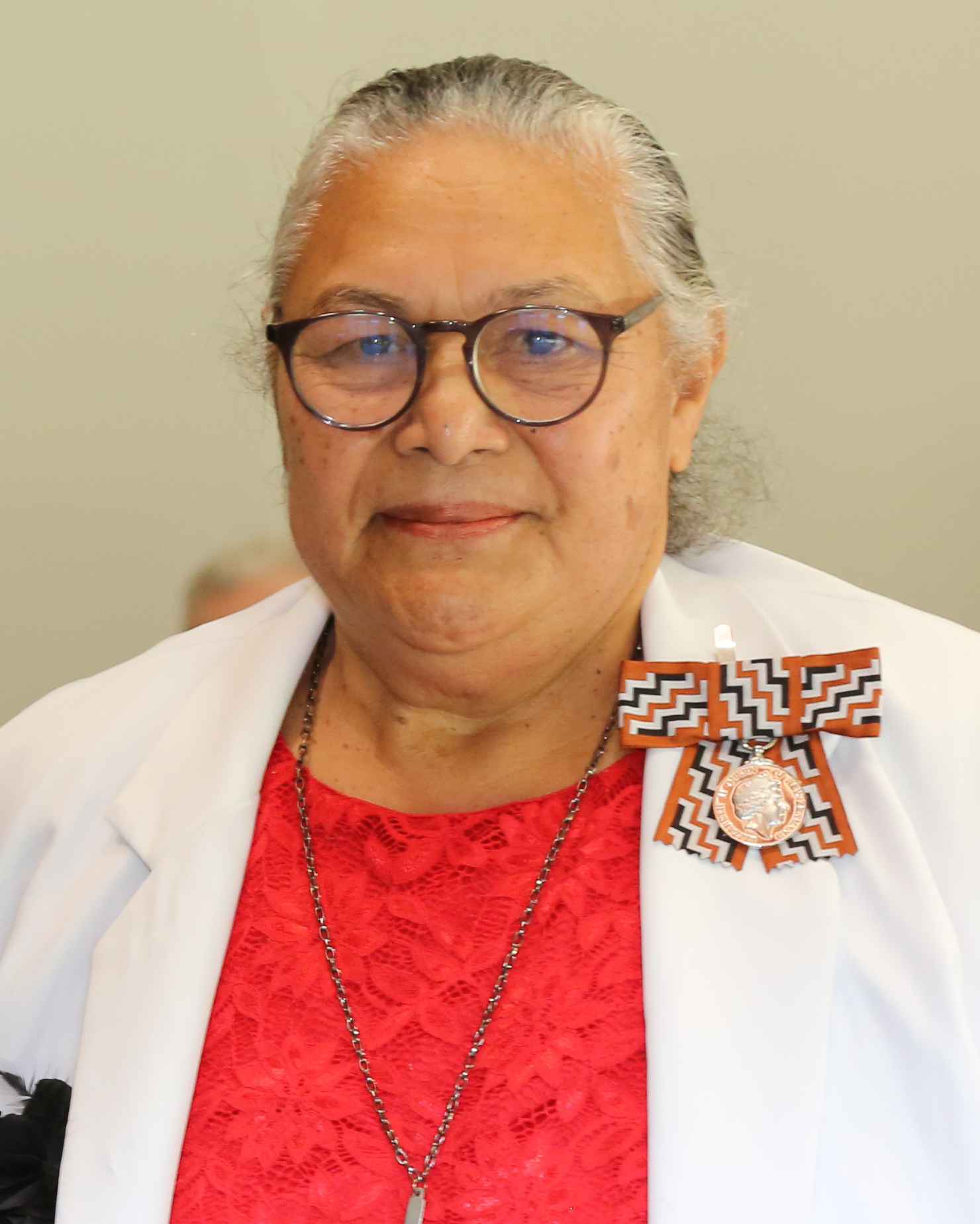
Falanisesi Hafoka

== New Zealand Distinguished Service Decoration (DSD) ==
- Lieutenant Colonel Anthony Dean Blythen – of Lower Hutt. For services to the New Zealand Defence Force.
- Wing Commander Richard Francis Deihl – of Auckland. For services to the New Zealand Defence Force.
