= List of schools in the Marlborough District =

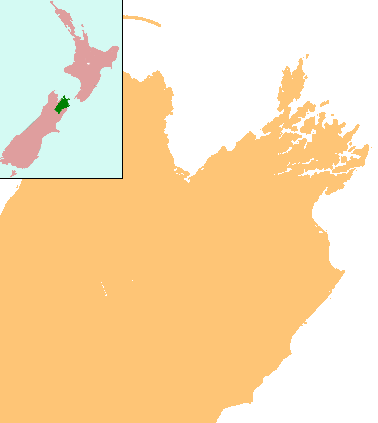
Localities offering secondary education in Marlborough

There are 30 schools in the Marlborough district, an area of the South Island of New Zealand. The district contains rural and small-town primary schools, combined primary/secondary schools in Rai Valley and Redwoodtown, a small secondary school in Picton, and several primary schools, an intermediate school, and two large secondary schools in Blenheim. All schools are coeducational except for two secondary schools in Blenheim: Marlborough Girls' and Boys' Colleges.

In New Zealand schools, students begin formal education in Year 1 at the age of five. Year 13 is the final year of secondary education. Years 14 and 15 refer to adult education facilities.

Most of the schools in Marlborough are state schools, which are fully funded by the government. State schools cannot charge tuition fees to New Zealand citizens and those non-citizens who are entitled to live in New Zealand indefinitely (e.g. permanent residents, residence visa holders, Australian citizens and permanent residents, refugees and protected persons), although a donation is commonly requested. The only schools in the district that are not state schools are two state-integrated schools, which are former private schools with a special character based on a religious or philosophical belief that have been integrated into the state system. State-integrated schools charge "attendance dues" to cover the building and maintenance of school buildings, which are not owned by the government, but otherwise they, like state schools, cannot charge fees for tuition of domestic students but may request a donation. One of the state-integrated schools is Catholic, while the other is an evangelical Christian school. Both state and state-integrated schools can charge fees for tuition of international students. There are no private schools in Marlborough. A primary school in Koromiko closed voluntarily in December 2012 due to declining roll numbers.

== Schools ==
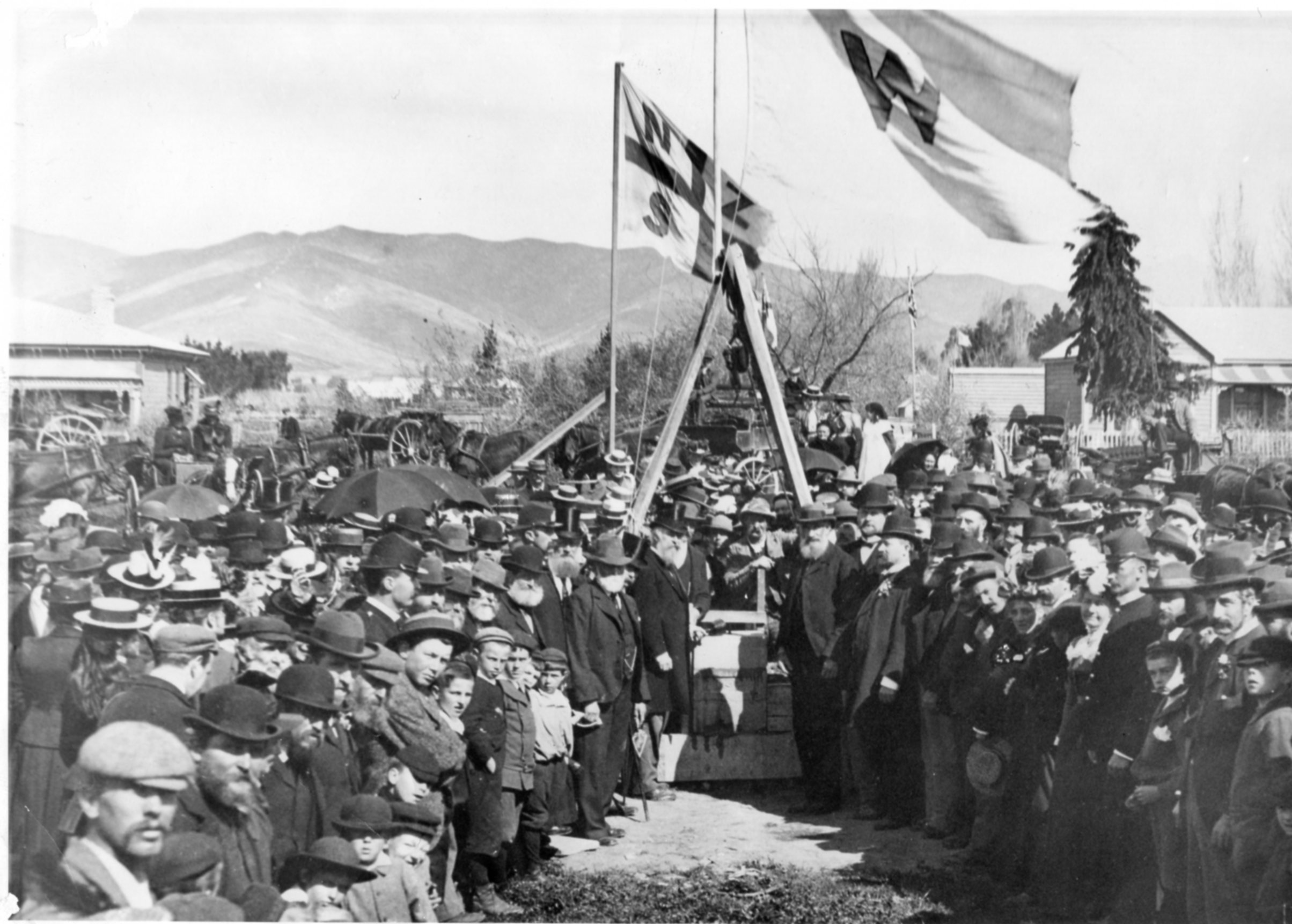
The laying of the foundation stone of Marlborough Boys' College, one of only two single-sex schools in Marlborough, the other being Marlborough Girls' College

The roll of each school changes frequently as students start school for the first time, move between schools, and graduate. The rolls given here are those provided by the Ministry of Education, based on figures from March 2025. The Ministry of Education institution number, given in the last column, links to the Education Counts page for each school.

Name	MOE	Years	Locality	Authority	Opened	Roll	Notes
Blenheim School	2811	1–6	Blenheim Central	State	1859	162	
Bohally Intermediate	2812	7–8	Springlands	State		511	
Canvastown School	3186	1–8	Canvastown	State		35	
Fairhall School	2839	1–8	Fairhall	State		181	
Grovetown School	2851	1–6	Grovetown	State	1866	63	
Havelock School	2855	1–8	Havelock	State	1861	62	
Linkwater School	2891	1–8	Linkwater	State		41	
Marlborough Boys' College	288	9–15	Blenheim Central	State	1963	1,059	
Marlborough Girls' College	289	9–15	Springlands	State	1963	964	
Mayfield School	2912	1–6	Mayfield	State		86	
Picton School	2956	1–6	Picton	State		113	
Queen Charlotte College	287	7–15	Picton	State	1965	395	
Rai Valley Area School	291	1–15	Rai Valley	State		106	
Rapaura School	2971	1–8	Rapaura	State	1862	102	
Redwoodtown School	2977	1–8	Redwoodtown	State	1912	297	
Renwick School	2978	1–8	Renwick	State		444	
Richmond View School	421	1–15	Redwoodtown	State-integrated		325	
Riverlands School	2981	1–8	Riverlands	State	1906	202	
Seddon School	2988	1–8	Seddon	State	1883	115	
Spring Creek School	2995	1–6	Spring Creek	State	1873	48	
Springlands School	2996	1–6	Springlands	State	1886	335	
St Mary's School	3012	1–8	Blenheim Central	State-integrated		170	
Tua Marina School	3050	1–8	Tuamarina	State	1871	94	
Waikawa Bay School	3057	1–6	Waikawa	State	1877	147	
Wairau Valley School	3062	1–8	Wairau Valley	State		39	
Waitaria Bay School	3064	1–8	Waitaria Bay	State	1897	8	
Ward School	3067	1–8	Ward	State	1906	56	
Whitney Street School	3071	1–6	Redwoodtown	State		335	
Witherlea School	3075	1–6	Witherlea	State		367	

== Closed schools ==
Name	Years	Area	Authority	Closure date	Reason for closure
Koromiko School	1–8	Koromiko	State	December 2012	Closed voluntarily due to declining roll numbers
