= Burleigh, New Zealand =

Burleigh
- Suburb
- Interactive map of Burleigh
- Coordinates: 41°32′S 173°56′E
- Country: New Zealand
- City: Blenheim, New Zealand
- Local authority: Marlborough District Council
- Electoral ward: Blenheim General Ward; Wairau-Awatere General Ward; Marlborough Māori Ward

Area
  - Land: 362 ha (890 acres)

Population (June 2025)
  - Total: 1,050
  - Density: 290/km^{2} (751/sq mi)
- Airports: Omaka Aerodrome

Woodbourne	Springlands	Blenheim Central
	Burleigh	Redwoodtown
		Witherlea

Burleigh is a suburb in inner Blenheim, in the Marlborough region of the South Island of New Zealand.

Ōmaka Marae is located in Burleigh. It is a marae (meeting ground) for the Tarakaipa hapū (sub-tribe) of Ngāti Apa ki te Rā Tō and includes Te Aroha o te Waipounamu wharenui (meeting house).

== Demographics ==
Burleigh covers 3.62 km^{2} (1.40 sq mi) and had an estimated population of 1,050 as of June 2025, with a population density of 290 people per km^{2}.

Historical population
Year	Pop.	±% p.a.
2013	303	—
2018	432	+7.35%
2023	984	+17.90%

Burleigh had a population of 984 in the 2023 New Zealand census, an increase of 552 people (127.8%) since the 2018 census, and an increase of 681 people (224.8%) since the 2013 census. There were 462 males and 519 females in 351 dwellings. 1.2% of people identified as LGBTIQ+. The median age was 37.0 years (compared with 38.1 years nationally). There were 228 people (23.2%) aged under 15 years, 153 (15.5%) aged 15 to 29, 438 (44.5%) aged 30 to 64, and 165 (16.8%) aged 65 or older.

People could identify as more than one ethnicity. The results were 85.7% European (Pākehā); 12.2% Māori; 2.1% Pasifika; 9.5% Asian; 2.4% Middle Eastern, Latin American and African New Zealanders (MELAA); and 1.8% other, which includes people giving their ethnicity as "New Zealander". English was spoken by 97.6%, Māori by 1.2%, Samoan by 0.3%, and other languages by 14.3%. No language could be spoken by 1.8% (e.g. too young to talk). New Zealand Sign Language was known by 0.3%. The percentage of people born overseas was 24.1, compared with 28.8% nationally.

Religious affiliations were 34.5% Christian, 2.4% Hindu, 0.9% Islam, 0.3% Māori religious beliefs, 0.9% Buddhist, 0.3% New Age, and 2.4% other religions. People who answered that they had no religion were 54.6%, and 4.3% of people did not answer the census question.

Of those at least 15 years old, 174 (23.0%) people had a bachelor's or higher degree, 435 (57.5%) had a post-high school certificate or diploma, and 141 (18.7%) people exclusively held high school qualifications. The median income was $49,100, compared with $41,500 nationally. 90 people (11.9%) earned over $100,000 compared to 12.1% nationally. The employment status of those at least 15 was 420 (55.6%) full-time, 114 (15.1%) part-time, and 12 (1.6%) unemployed.
