= Riversdale, Blenheim =

Suburb of Blenheim, New Zealand

Riversdale
- Suburb
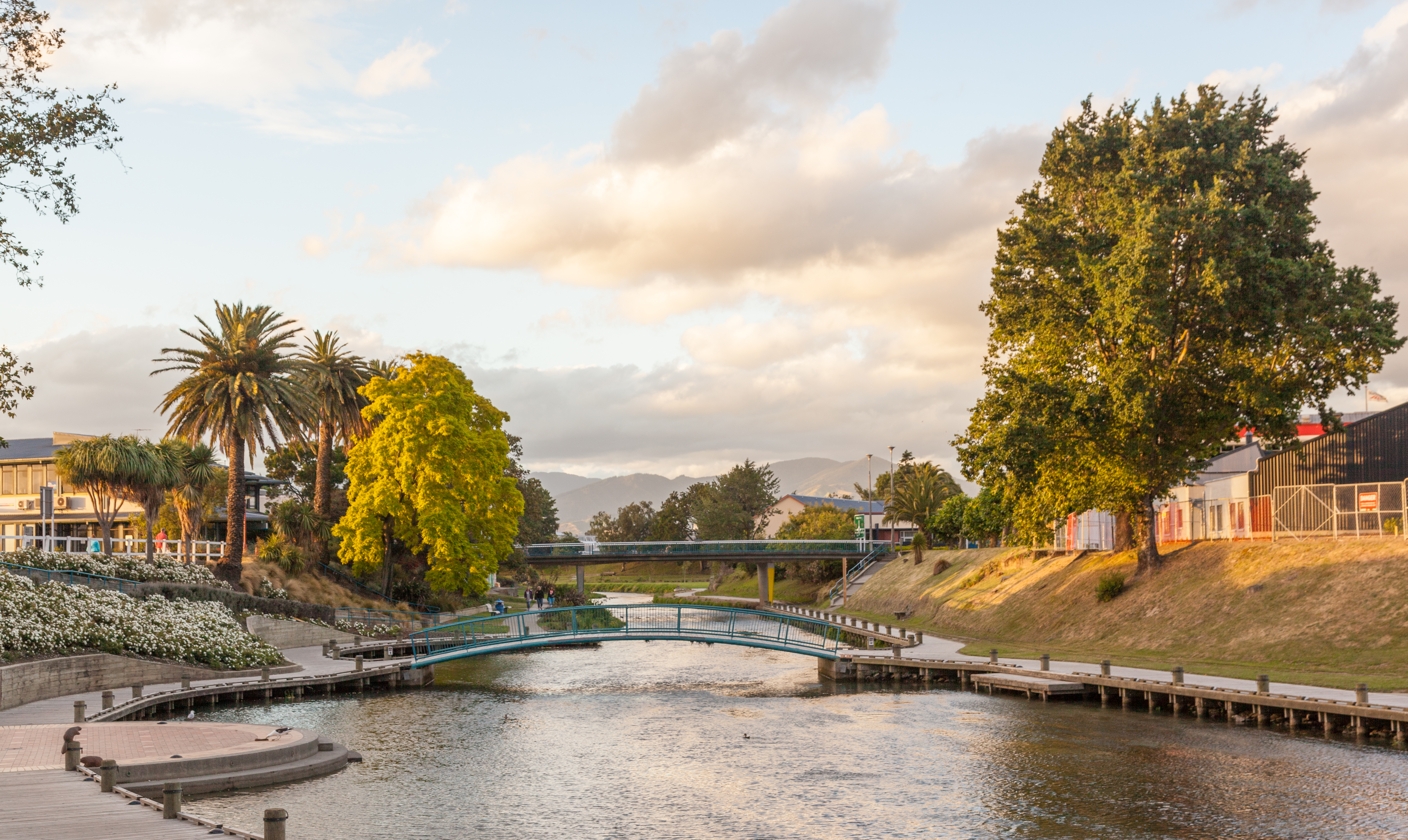
- The Ōpaoa River running through Islington
- Interactive map of Riversdale
- Coordinates: 41.505°S 173.969°E
- Country: New Zealand
- City: Blenheim, New Zealand
- Local authority: Marlborough District Council
- Electoral ward: Blenheim General Ward; Marlborough Māori Ward

Area
  - Land: 110 ha (270 acres)

Population (June 2025)
  - Total: 2,390
  - Density: 2,200/km^{2} (5,600/sq mi)

	Grovetown
Mayfield	Riversdale	Wairau Bar
Blenheim Central		Riverlands

Riversdale is a suburb of Blenheim, in the Marlborough region of the South Island of New Zealand. Riversdale is separated from the rest of Blenheim by the Ōpaoa River on the north, east and western sides, and by the Main North Line and State Highway 1 on the western side. To the south, Islington is similarly separated on three sides by the Ōpaoa.

The Nelson Marlborough Institute of Technology has its Marlborough Campus in Riversdale.

== Demographics ==
Riversdale and Islington cover 1.10 km^{2} (0.42 sq mi). They had an estimated population of 2,390 as of June 2025, with a population density of 2,173 people per km^{2}.

Historical population
Year	Pop.	±% p.a.
2006	2,151	—
2013	2,070	−0.55%
2018	2,319	+2.30%
2023	2,322	+0.03%

Riversdale-Islington had a population of 2,322 in the 2023 New Zealand census, an increase of 3 people (0.1%) since the 2018 census, and an increase of 252 people (12.2%) since the 2013 census. There were 1,155 males, 1,164 females, and 3 people of other genders in 870 dwellings. 2.6% of people identified as LGBTIQ+. The median age was 39.7 years (compared with 38.1 years nationally). There were 435 people (18.7%) aged under 15 years, 429 (18.5%) aged 15 to 29, 1,026 (44.2%) aged 30 to 64, and 432 (18.6%) aged 65 or older.

People could identify as more than one ethnicity. The results were 79.6% European (Pākehā); 23.5% Māori; 6.7% Pasifika; 6.3% Asian; 2.8% Middle Eastern, Latin American and African New Zealanders (MELAA); and 2.3% other, which includes people giving their ethnicity as "New Zealander". English was spoken by 96.0%, Māori by 6.1%, Samoan by 1.9%, and other languages by 9.3%. No language could be spoken by 1.9% (e.g. too young to talk). New Zealand Sign Language was known by 0.5%. The percentage of people born overseas was 18.0, compared with 28.8% nationally.

Religious affiliations were 26.6% Christian, 0.5% Hindu, 0.6% Islam, 1.3% Māori religious beliefs, 1.2% Buddhist, 0.5% New Age, and 0.9% other religions. People who answered that they had no religion were 59.8%, and 8.8% of people did not answer the census question.

Of those at least 15 years old, 225 (11.9%) people had a bachelor's or higher degree, 1,065 (56.4%) had a post-high school certificate or diploma, and 594 (31.5%) people exclusively held high school qualifications. The median income was $38,600, compared with $41,500 nationally. 93 people (4.9%) earned over $100,000 compared to 12.1% nationally. The employment status of those at least 15 was 987 (52.3%) full-time, 258 (13.7%) part-time, and 45 (2.4%) unemployed.
