= List of marae in the Marlborough District =

This is a list of marae (Māori meeting grounds) in the Marlborough region.

== List of marae ==
Marae name	Wharenui name	Iwi and hapū	Location
Ōmaka	Te Aroha o te Waipounamu	Ngāti Apa ki te Rā Tō (Tarakaipa)	Blenheim
Hauhunga	Parerarua	Ngāti Rārua	Wairau Valley
Te Hora	Te Hora	Ngāti Kuia	Canvastown
Tua Mātene	Te Huataki	Rangitāne o Wairau	Grovetown
Waikawa Marae	Arapaoa	Te Atiawa o Te Waka-a-Māui	Picton
Wairau Marae	Wairau Wharenui	Ngāti Rārua, Ngāti Toa Rangatira	Spring Creek

== See also ==
- Lists of marae in New Zealand
- List of marae in Nelson, New Zealand
- List of marae in the Canterbury region
- List of schools in the Marlborough region
