= Springlands =

Suburb of Blenheim, New Zealand

- Suburb
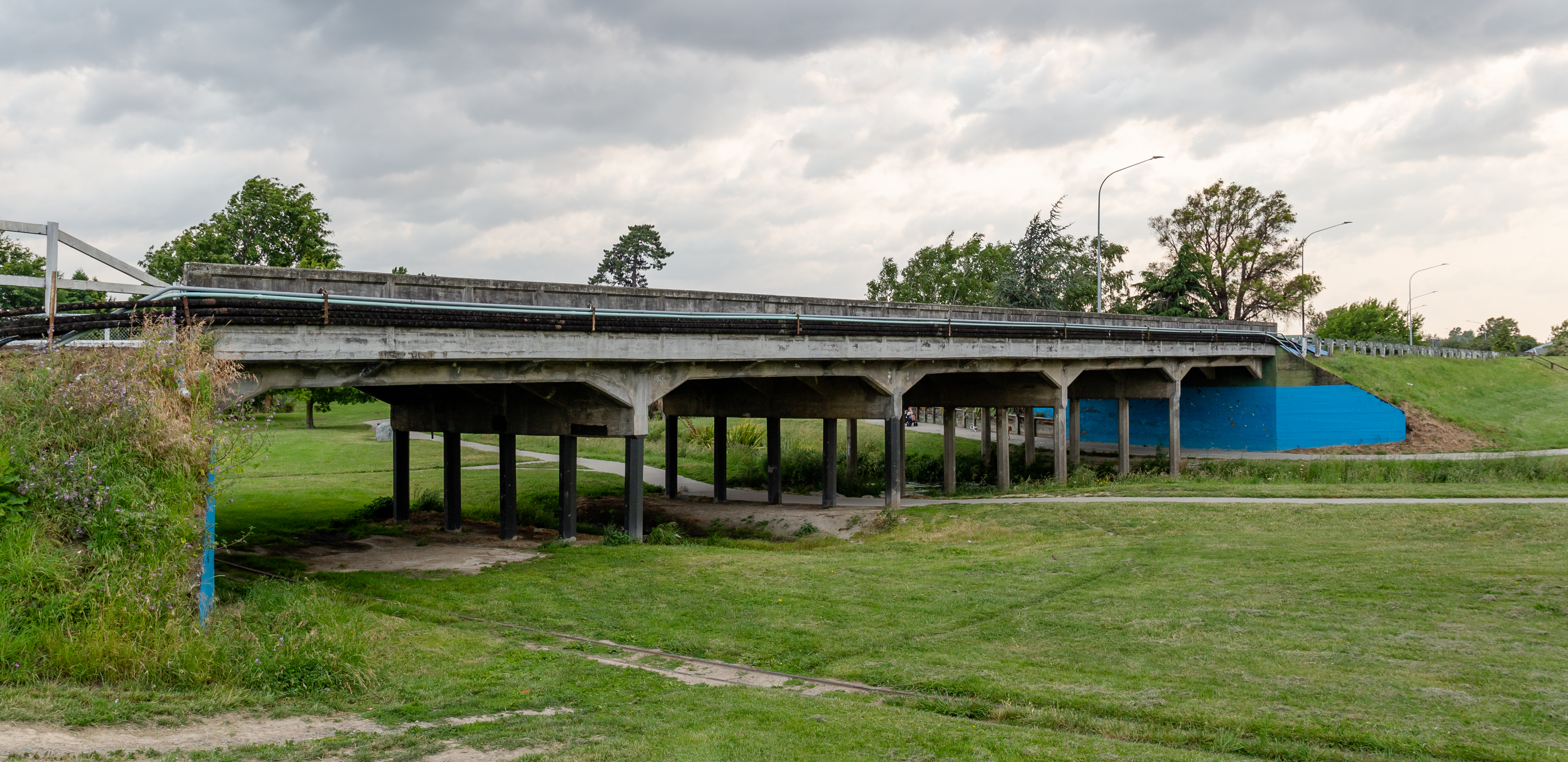
- The High Street bridge separates Springlands from Blenheim Central
- Interactive map of Springlands
- Coordinates: 41.5088°S 173.9376°E
- Country: New Zealand
- City: Blenheim, New Zealand
- Local authority: Marlborough District Council
- Electoral ward: Blenheim General Ward; Marlborough Māori Ward

Area
  - Land: 530 ha (1,300 acres)

Population (June 2025)
  - Total: 6,130
  - Density: 1,200/km^{2} (3,000/sq mi)

Rapaura	Thomsons Ford	Grovetown
Woodbourne	Springlands	Mayfield
Fairhall	Redwoodtown	Blenheim Central

Springlands is a suburb to the west of Blenheim's central district. It is located on and around SH 6 (Nelson Street), the main road to Renwick. It has a tavern, various takeaways, and a superstore.

== Demographics ==
Springlands covers 5.30 km^{2} (2.05 sq mi) and had an estimated population of 6,130 as of June 2025, with a population density of 1,157 people per km^{2}.

Historical population
Year	Pop.	±% p.a.
2006	5,016	—
2013	5,463	+1.23%
2018	5,979	+1.82%
2023	6,090	+0.37%
The 2006 population is for a smaller area of 4.19 km^{2}. Source:

Springlands had a population of 6,090 in the 2023 New Zealand census, an increase of 111 people (1.9%) since the 2018 census, and an increase of 627 people (11.5%) since the 2013 census. There were 2,838 males, 3,231 females, and 21 people of other genders in 2,397 dwellings. 2.7% of people identified as LGBTIQ+. There were 909 people (14.9%) aged under 15 years, 891 (14.6%) aged 15 to 29, 2,481 (40.7%) aged 30 to 64, and 1,818 (29.9%) aged 65 or older.

People could identify as more than one ethnicity. The results were 84.3% European (Pākehā); 12.5% Māori; 3.8% Pasifika; 7.6% Asian; 1.7% Middle Eastern, Latin American and African New Zealanders (MELAA); and 2.5% other, which includes people giving their ethnicity as "New Zealander". English was spoken by 97.0%, Māori by 2.0%, Samoan by 0.5%, and other languages by 11.2%. No language could be spoken by 1.8% (e.g. too young to talk). New Zealand Sign Language was known by 0.3%. The percentage of people born overseas was 21.5, compared with 28.8% nationally.

Religious affiliations were 36.8% Christian, 1.1% Hindu, 0.5% Islam, 0.6% Māori religious beliefs, 0.7% Buddhist, 0.2% New Age, and 1.4% other religions. People who answered that they had no religion were 51.4%, and 7.4% of people did not answer the census question.

Of those at least 15 years old, 1,095 (21.1%) people had a bachelor's or higher degree, 2,745 (53.0%) had a post-high school certificate or diploma, and 1,356 (26.2%) people exclusively held high school qualifications. 525 people (10.1%) earned over $100,000 compared to 12.1% nationally. The employment status of those at least 15 was 2,385 (46.0%) full-time, 711 (13.7%) part-time, and 78 (1.5%) unemployed.

Individual statistical areas
Name	Area (km^{2})	Population	Density (per km^{2})	Dwellings	Median age	Median income
Springlands	2.75	3,585	1,304	1,341	48.8 years	$38,400
Yelverton	2.55	2,505	982	1,056	49.0 years	$36,200
New Zealand					38.1 years	$41,500

== Education ==
Springlands School is a contributing primary (years 1–6) school with a roll of 328 students. The school was established in 1886.

Bohally Intermediate is a state intermediate (Year 7–8) school opened in 1956 following a split from Marlborough College. It has a roll of 534.

Marlborough Girls' College is a state girls' secondary (Year 9–13) school. It opened in 1963 following the split of Marlborough College into separate boys' and girls' schools, and has a roll of 971.

The first two schools are coeducational. Rolls are as of March 2026.

== Historic generating station ==
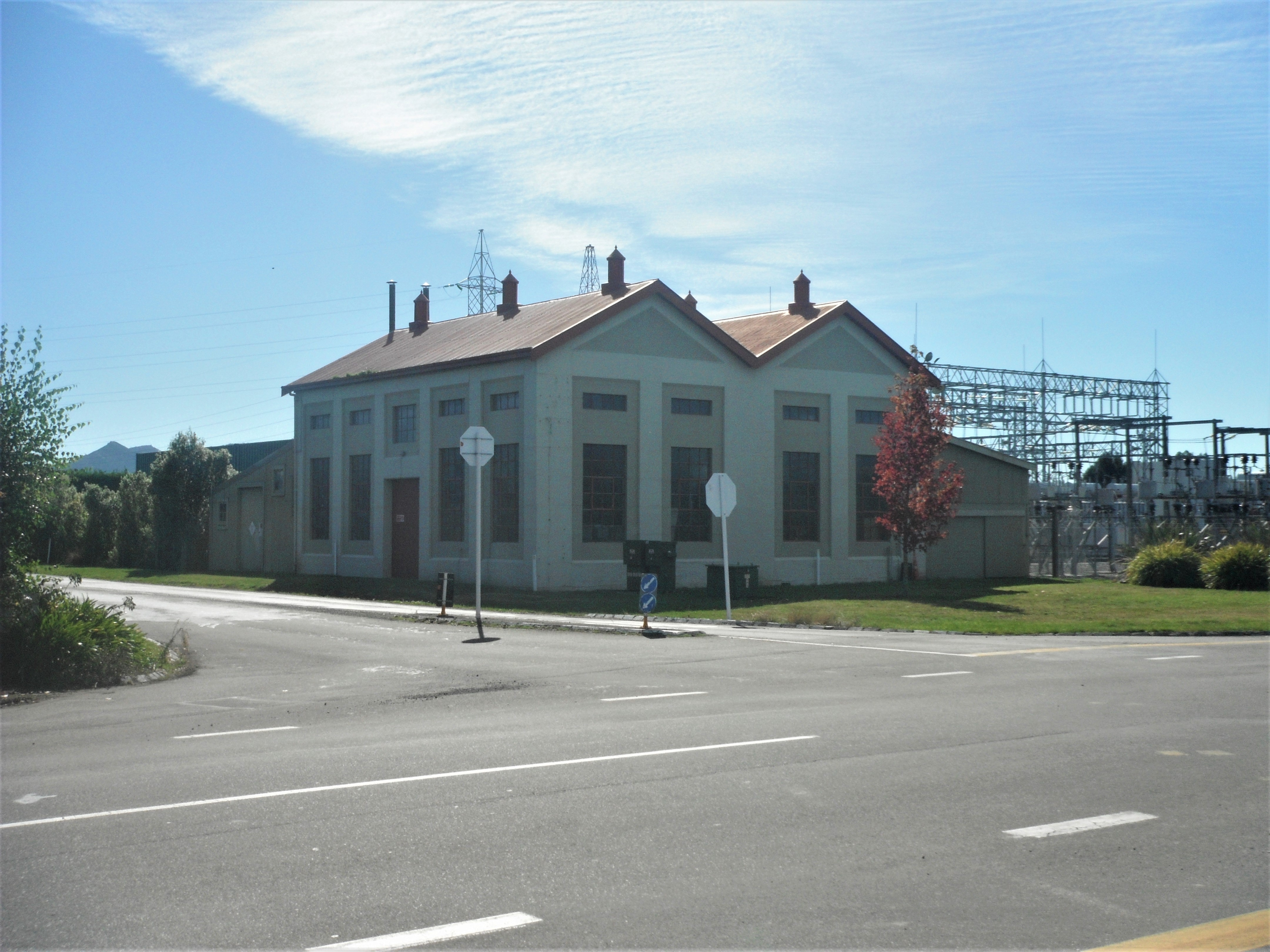
Springlands diesel station

An industrial building on Old Renwick Road, adjacent to the Transpower substation, contains diesel generators that date back to 1930.

The Marlborough Region was not connected to the rest of the national grid until the mid-1950s. The supply of electricity to Marlborough was initially dependent on a small hydro station at Waihopai Valley. In 1930, a diesel generator was established at Springlands to provide backup power when hydrogeneration was not available. A further generator set was installed in 1937. These generators have been preserved by Marlborough Lines as part of the engineering heritage of electricity supply in the region.
