= Mayfield, Blenheim =

Suburb of Blenheim, New Zealand

Mayfield
- Suburb
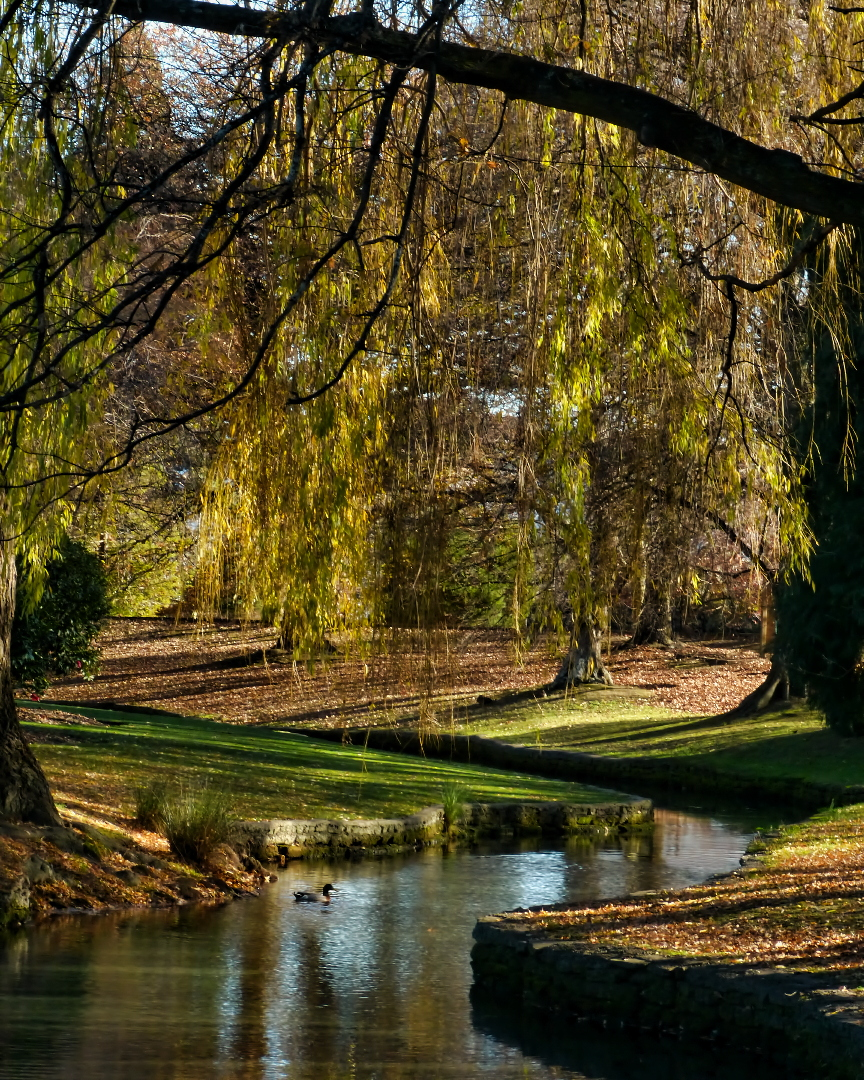
- Pollard Park
- Interactive map of Mayfield
- Coordinates: 41.503333°S 173.953398°E
- Country: New Zealand
- City: Blenheim, New Zealand
- Local authority: Marlborough District Council
- Electoral ward: Blenheim General Ward; Marlborough Māori Ward

Area
  - Land: 146 ha (360 acres)

Population (June 2025)
  - Total: 1,800
  - Density: 1,200/km^{2} (3,200/sq mi)

Thomsons Ford	Grovetown
Springlands	Mayfield	Riversdale
Redwoodtown	Blenheim Central	Islington

Mayfield is a suburb to the north of Blenheim's central district, in the Marlborough region of the South Island of New Zealand. Pollard Park and Lansdowne Park are large parks to the west and north of the suburb, and a racecourse lies to the northwest.

== Demographics ==
Mayfield covers 1.46 km^{2} (0.56 sq mi). It had an estimated population of 1,800 as of June 2025, with a population density of 1,233 people per km^{2}.

Historical population
Year	Pop.	±% p.a.
2006	1,470	—
2013	1,539	+0.66%
2018	1,674	+1.70%
2023	1,689	+0.18%

Mayfield had a population of 1,689 in the 2023 New Zealand census, an increase of 15 people (0.9%) since the 2018 census, and an increase of 150 people (9.7%) since the 2013 census. There were 855 males, 837 females, and 3 people of other genders in 738 dwellings. 3.0% of people identified as LGBTIQ+. The median age was 39.3 years (compared with 38.1 years nationally). There were 294 people (17.4%) aged under 15 years, 300 (17.8%) aged 15 to 29, 765 (45.3%) aged 30 to 64, and 327 (19.4%) aged 65 or older.

People could identify as more than one ethnicity. The results were 76.0% European (Pākehā); 19.5% Māori; 5.9% Pasifika; 9.4% Asian; 3.4% Middle Eastern, Latin American and African New Zealanders (MELAA); and 2.5% other, which includes people giving their ethnicity as "New Zealander". English was spoken by 96.1%, Māori by 3.4%, Samoan by 1.8%, and other languages by 11.9%. No language could be spoken by 1.8% (e.g. too young to talk). New Zealand Sign Language was known by 0.5%. The percentage of people born overseas was 21.0, compared with 28.8% nationally.

Religious affiliations were 28.8% Christian, 2.1% Hindu, 0.4% Islam, 1.2% Māori religious beliefs, 2.3% Buddhist, 0.5% New Age, and 0.5% other religions. People who answered that they had no religion were 57.2%, and 7.1% of people did not answer the census question.

Of those at least 15 years old, 165 (11.8%) people had a bachelor's or higher degree, 765 (54.8%) had a post-high school certificate or diploma, and 468 (33.5%) people exclusively held high school qualifications. The median income was $36,700, compared with $41,500 nationally. 51 people (3.7%) earned over $100,000 compared to 12.1% nationally. The employment status of those at least 15 was 723 (51.8%) full-time, 189 (13.5%) part-time, and 24 (1.7%) unemployed.

== Education ==
Mayfield School is a coeducational contributing primary (years 1–6) school with a roll of 88 students as of March 2026. It opened in 1955.
