= Witherlea =

Suburb of Blenheim, New Zealand

- Suburb
- Interactive map of Witherlea
- Coordinates: 41.538°S 173.954°E
- Country: New Zealand
- City: Blenheim, New Zealand
- Local authority: Marlborough District Council
- Electoral ward: Blenheim General Ward; Marlborough Māori Ward

Area
  - Land: 381 ha (940 acres)

Population (June 2025)
  - Total: 5,930
  - Density: 1,560/km^{2} (4,030/sq mi)
- Hospitals: Wairau Hospital

Burleigh	Redwoodtown	Riverlands
	Witherlea
	(Wither Hills)

Witherlea is a suburb to the south of Blenheim's central district.

The Blenheim hospital campus, which includes Wairau Hospital, is in Witherlea.

Omaka Cemetery has graves from early Pākehā settlement in the Wairau area.

== Demographics ==
Witherlea covers 3.81 km^{2} (1.47 sq mi). It had an estimated population of 5,930 as of June 2025, with a population density of 1,528 people per km^{2}.

Historical population
Year	Pop.	±% p.a.
2006	4,563	—
2013	4,836	+0.83%
2018	5,406	+2.25%
2023	5,757	+1.27%

Witherlea had a population of 5,757 in the 2023 New Zealand census, an increase of 351 people (6.5%) since the 2018 census, and an increase of 921 people (19.0%) since the 2013 census. There were 2,826 males, 2,907 females, and 24 people of other genders in 2,265 dwellings. 2.5% of people identified as LGBTIQ+. The median age was 44.7 years (compared with 38.1 years nationally). There were 1,056 people (18.3%) aged under 15 years, 759 (13.2%) aged 15 to 29, 2,571 (44.7%) aged 30 to 64, and 1,371 (23.8%) aged 65 or older.

People could identify as more than one ethnicity. The results were 88.9% European (Pākehā); 11.4% Māori; 2.6% Pasifika; 5.6% Asian; 1.5% Middle Eastern, Latin American and African New Zealanders (MELAA); and 3.1% other, which includes people giving their ethnicity as "New Zealander". English was spoken by 97.7%, Māori by 1.4%, Samoan by 0.5%, and other languages by 9.3%. No language could be spoken by 1.7% (e.g. too young to talk). New Zealand Sign Language was known by 0.5%. The percentage of people born overseas was 20.1, compared with 28.8% nationally.

Religious affiliations were 33.0% Christian, 0.6% Hindu, 0.2% Islam, 0.1% Māori religious beliefs, 0.6% Buddhist, 0.2% New Age, 0.1% Jewish, and 1.0% other religions. People who answered that they had no religion were 56.7%, and 7.7% of people did not answer the census question.

Of those at least 15 years old, 930 (19.8%) people had a bachelor's or higher degree, 2,682 (57.1%) had a post-high school certificate or diploma, and 1,089 (23.2%) people exclusively held high school qualifications. The median income was $41,100, compared with $41,500 nationally. 453 people (9.6%) earned over $100,000 compared to 12.1% nationally. The employment status of those at least 15 was 2,325 (49.5%) full-time, 717 (15.3%) part-time, and 54 (1.1%) unemployed.

Individual statistical areas
Name	Area (km^{2})	Population	Density (per km^{2})	Dwellings	Median age	Median income
Witherlea West	2.44	2,952	1,210	1,164	46.8 years	$40,500
Witherlea East	1.37	2,805	2,047	1,101	42.9 years	$41,700
New Zealand					38.1 years	$41,500

== Education ==
Witherlea School is a coeducational contributing primary (years 1-6) school with a roll of 372 students as of March 2026. It opened in 1968.
