= Waitaria Bay =

- Interactive map of Waitaria Bay
- Coordinates: 41°9′26″S 174°2′54″E
- Country: New Zealand
- Region: Marlborough
- Ward: Marlborough Sounds General Ward; Marlborough Māori Ward
- Electorates: Kaikōura; Te Tai Tonga (Māori)

Government
  - Territorial Authority: Marlborough District Council
  - Marlborough District Mayor: Nadine Taylor
  - Kaikōura MP: Stuart Smith
  - Te Tai Tonga MP: Tākuta Ferris

Area
  - Total: 232.24 km^{2} (89.67 sq mi)

Population (2023 census)
  - Total: 165
  - Density: 0.710/km^{2} (1.84/sq mi)

Waitaria Bay is a locality in the Marlborough region of New Zealand. It lies on the northern side of Kenepuru Sound in the Marlborough Sounds.

The town is one of the most isolated in the South Island to have a school. The nearest shop is about 50 minutes drive, the nearest small town, Havelock, is two hours drive, and the nearest main centre, Blenheim, is two and a half hours drive.

== Demographics ==
Waitaria Bay locality, which includes Manaroa, Crail Bay and Nopera, covers 232.24 km^{2} (89.67 sq mi). It is part of the larger Marlborough Sounds East statistical area.

Historical population
Year	Pop.	±% p.a.
2006	246	—
2013	156	−6.30%
2018	153	−0.39%
2023	165	+1.52%
The 2006 population is for a larger area of 396.98 km^{2}. Source:

Waitaria Bay had a population of 165 in the 2023 New Zealand census, an increase of 12 people (7.8%) since the 2018 census, and an increase of 9 people (5.8%) since the 2013 census. There were 90 males and 72 females in 78 dwellings. The median age was 60.6 years (compared with 38.1 years nationally). There were 21 people (12.7%) aged under 15 years, 3 (1.8%) aged 15 to 29, 75 (45.5%) aged 30 to 64, and 66 (40.0%) aged 65 or older.

People could identify as more than one ethnicity. The results were 90.9% European (Pākehā); 3.6% Māori; 1.8% Pasifika; 1.8% Asian; 1.8% Middle Eastern, Latin American and African New Zealanders (MELAA); and 10.9% other, which includes people giving their ethnicity as "New Zealander". English was spoken by 98.2%, Māori by 1.8%, and other languages by 10.9%. The percentage of people born overseas was 18.2, compared with 28.8% nationally.

Religious affiliations were 27.3% Christian, and 1.8% Māori religious beliefs. People who answered that they had no religion were 52.7%, and 16.4% of people did not answer the census question.

Of those at least 15 years old, 33 (22.9%) people had a bachelor's or higher degree, 75 (52.1%) had a post-high school certificate or diploma, and 33 (22.9%) people exclusively held high school qualifications. The median income was $27,600, compared with $41,500 nationally. 15 people (10.4%) earned over $100,000 compared to 12.1% nationally. The employment status of those at least 15 was 51 (35.4%) full-time and 33 (22.9%) part-time.

== Education ==
Waitaria Bay School is a coeducational full primary (years 1-8) school with a roll of 12 (as of March 2026).. The school opened in 1897 but closed in 1924 as there were no students. It reopened about 1944.

Nopera Bay School opened in 1909. It closed and merged to Waitaria Bay in 1970.
