= Koromiko, New Zealand =

Locality in Marlborough, New Zealand

Koromiko
- Interactive map of Koromiko
- Coordinates: 41°20′23″S 173°57′45″E
- Country: New Zealand
- Region: Marlborough
- Ward: Marlborough Sounds General Ward; Marlborough Māori Ward
- Electorates: Kaikōura; Te Tai Tonga (Māori)

Government
  - Territorial Authority: Marlborough District Council
  - Marlborough District Mayor: Nadine Taylor
  - Kaikōura MP: Stuart Smith
  - Te Tai Tonga MP: Tākuta Ferris

Area
  - Total: 90.32 km^{2} (34.87 sq mi)

Population (2023 census)
  - Total: 396
  - Density: 4.38/km^{2} (11.4/sq mi)

Koromiko is a locality in Marlborough, New Zealand. State Highway 1 runs through the area. Picton is about 6.5 km (4.0 mi) to the northeast, and Blenheim is about 21 km (13 mi) to the south.

Picton Aerodrome is located at Koromiko. It has flights to and from Wellington several times a day operated by Sounds Air.

== Demographics ==
Koromiko locality covers 90.32 km^{2} (34.87 sq mi) It is part of the larger Marlborough Sounds East statistical area.

Historical population
Year	Pop.	±% p.a.
2006	348	—
2013	321	−1.15%
2018	402	+4.60%
2023	396	−0.30%
The 2006 population is for a larger area of 91.21 km^{2}. Source:

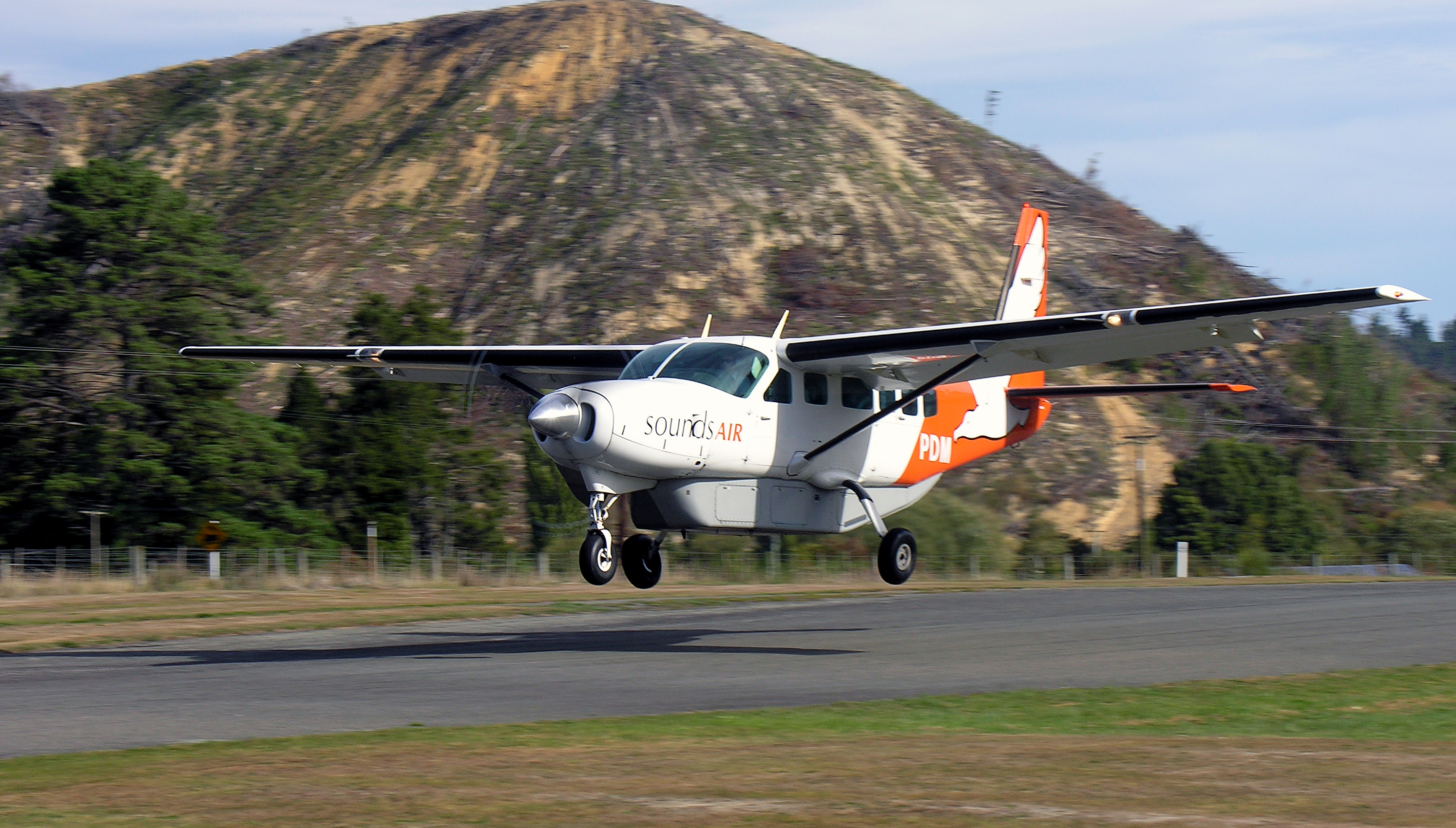
Picton Airport is located at Koromiko

Koromiko had a population of 396 in the 2023 New Zealand census, a decrease of 6 people (−1.5%) since the 2018 census, and an increase of 75 people (23.4%) since the 2013 census. There were 192 males, 201 females, and 3 people of other genders in 159 dwellings. 2.3% of people identified as LGBTIQ+. There were 54 people (13.6%) aged under 15 years, 45 (11.4%) aged 15 to 29, 210 (53.0%) aged 30 to 64, and 81 (20.5%) aged 65 or older.

People could identify as more than one ethnicity. The results were 93.2% European (Pākehā), 20.5% Māori, 1.5% Pasifika, and 3.0% other, which includes people giving their ethnicity as "New Zealander". English was spoken by 100.0%, Māori by 2.3%, and other languages by 3.0%. New Zealand Sign Language was known by 0.8%. The percentage of people born overseas was 10.6, compared with 28.8% nationally.

Religious affiliations were 25.0% Christian, 1.5% Māori religious beliefs, 0.8% Jewish, and 0.8% other religions. People who answered that they had no religion were 63.6%, and 8.3% of people did not answer the census question.

Of those at least 15 years old, 33 (9.6%) people had a bachelor's or higher degree, 201 (58.8%) had a post-high school certificate or diploma, and 105 (30.7%) people exclusively held high school qualifications. 27 people (7.9%) earned over $100,000 compared to 12.1% nationally. The employment status of those at least 15 was 192 (56.1%) full-time, 57 (16.7%) part-time, and 3 (0.9%) unemployed.

== Education ==
Koromiko School was a coeducational full primary (years 1–8) school. It was founded in 1873, and closed at the beginning of 2013.
