= Blenheim Central =

Central Business District of Blenheim, New Zealand

- Suburb
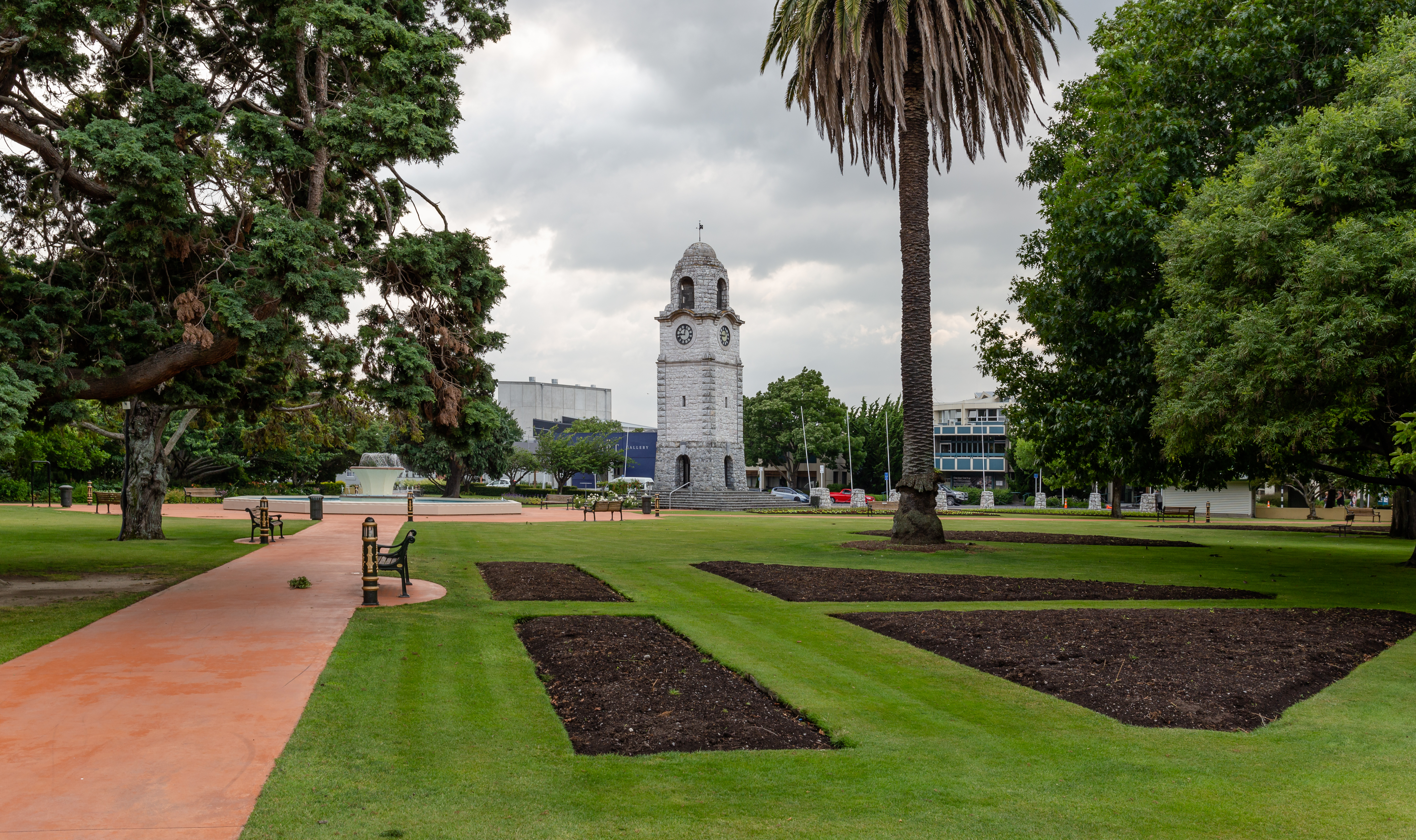
- Seymour Square
- Interactive map of Blenheim Central
- Coordinates: 41.513°S 173.954°E
- Country: New Zealand
- City: Blenheim, New Zealand
- Local authority: Marlborough District Council
- Electoral ward: Blenheim General Ward; Marlborough Māori Ward

Area
  - Land: 155 ha (380 acres)

Population (June 2025)
  - Total: 1,320
  - Density: 852/km^{2} (2,210/sq mi)

Mayfield		Riversdale
Springlands	Blenheim Central
	Redwoodtown	Riverlands

Blenheim Central is the central suburb and central business district of Blenheim, in the Marlborough region of the South Island of New Zealand. The central park, Seymour Square, contains a clock tower and war memorial fountain.

== Demographics ==
Blenheim Central covers 1.55 km^{2} (0.60 sq mi). It had an estimated population of 1,320 as of June 2025, with a population density of 852 people per km^{2}.

Historical population
Year	Pop.	±% p.a.
2006	1,110	—
2013	1,068	−0.55%
2018	1,152	+1.53%
2023	1,200	+0.82%

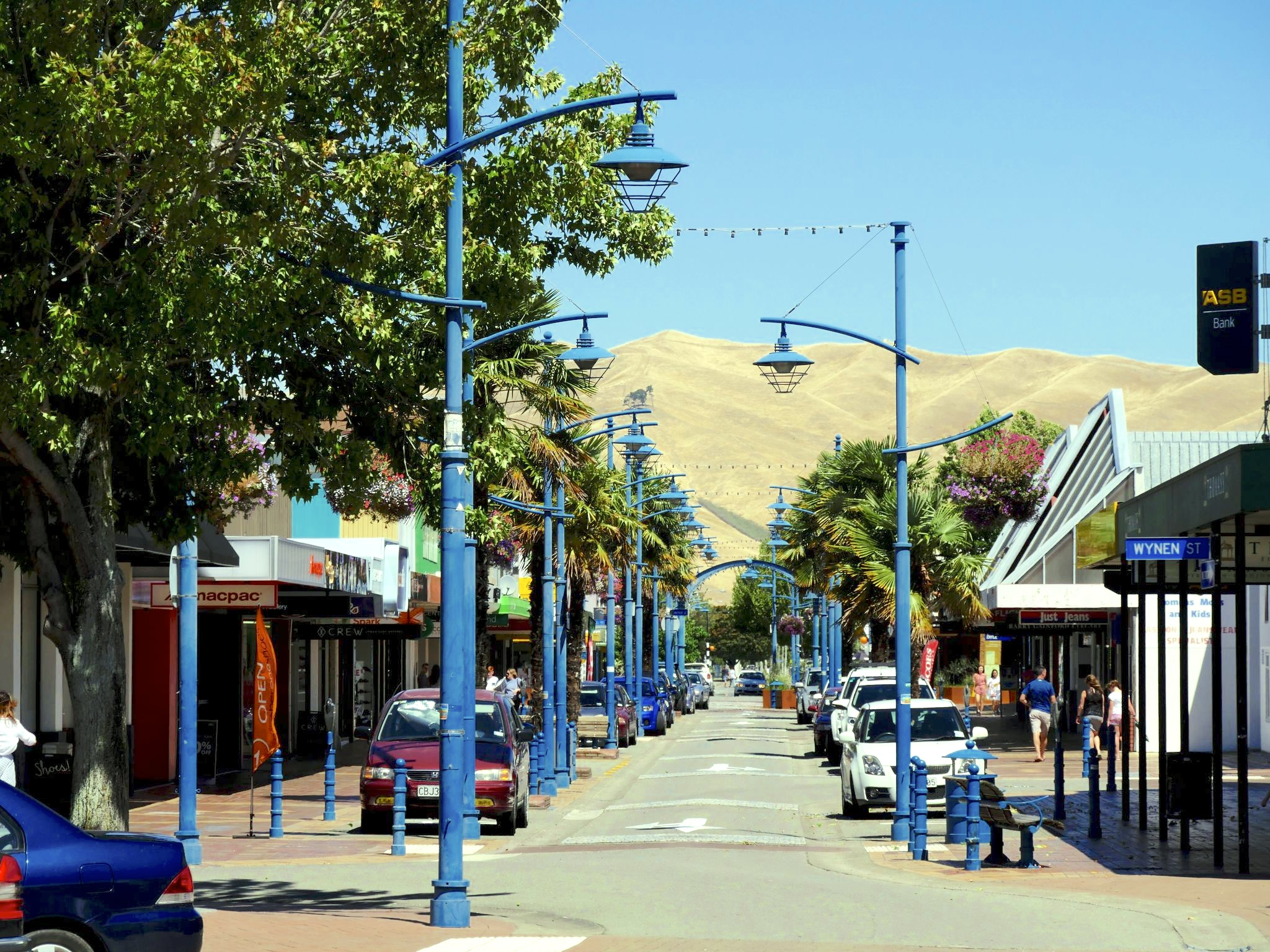
Market Street

Blenheim Central had a population of 1,200 in the 2023 New Zealand census, an increase of 48 people (4.2%) since the 2018 census, and an increase of 132 people (12.4%) since the 2013 census. There were 672 males, 525 females, and 6 people of other genders in 498 dwellings. 2.8% of people identified as LGBTIQ+. The median age was 36.2 years (compared with 38.1 years nationally). There were 198 people (16.5%) aged under 15 years, 255 (21.2%) aged 15 to 29, 549 (45.8%) aged 30 to 64, and 198 (16.5%) aged 65 or older.

People could identify as more than one ethnicity. The results were 75.2% European (Pākehā); 20.5% Māori; 9.2% Pasifika; 8.5% Asian; 2.2% Middle Eastern, Latin American and African New Zealanders (MELAA); and 3.5% other, which includes people giving their ethnicity as "New Zealander". English was spoken by 96.8%, Māori by 5.5%, Samoan by 0.8%, and other languages by 13.5%. No language could be spoken by 1.8% (e.g. too young to talk). New Zealand Sign Language was known by 0.8%. The percentage of people born overseas was 22.8, compared with 28.8% nationally.

Religious affiliations were 31.0% Christian, 0.8% Hindu, 0.8% Islam, 1.0% Māori religious beliefs, 1.0% Buddhist, 1.5% New Age, 0.2% Jewish, and 2.0% other religions. People who answered that they had no religion were 55.0%, and 7.0% of people did not answer the census question.

Of those at least 15 years old, 132 (13.2%) people had a bachelor's or higher degree, 522 (52.1%) had a post-high school certificate or diploma, and 348 (34.7%) people exclusively held high school qualifications. The median income was $35,800, compared with $41,500 nationally. 36 people (3.6%) earned over $100,000 compared to 12.1% nationally. The employment status of those at least 15 was 546 (54.5%) full-time, 126 (12.6%) part-time, and 33 (3.3%) unemployed.

== Education ==
Blenheim School is a coeducational contributing primary school (years 1-6) with a roll of 136 students. It opened in 1859. It also provided secondary education from 1879 until the establishment of Marlborough High School in 1900. The current buildings were constructed in an open air style between 1937 and 1942.

Marlborough Boys' College is a single-sex secondary school (years 9–13) with a roll of 1,038 students. It began as the co-educational Marlborough High School in 1900, and moved to the current site in 1901. In 1919, it became Marlborough College. In 1956, forms 1 and 2 (now years 7 and 8) moved to the new Bohally Intermediate and in 1963, the girls moved to Marlborough Girls' College.

St Mary's School is a state-integrated Catholic primary school (years 1-8) with a roll of 168 students. Catholic education started in Blenheim in 1872. St Joseph's Girls' School was open by 1885 and St Mary's Boys' School opened subsequently. St Joseph's and St Mary's merged to form the current school in the early 1970s.

Rolls are as of March 2026.
