= Redwoodtown =

Suburb of Blenheim, New Zealand

- Suburb
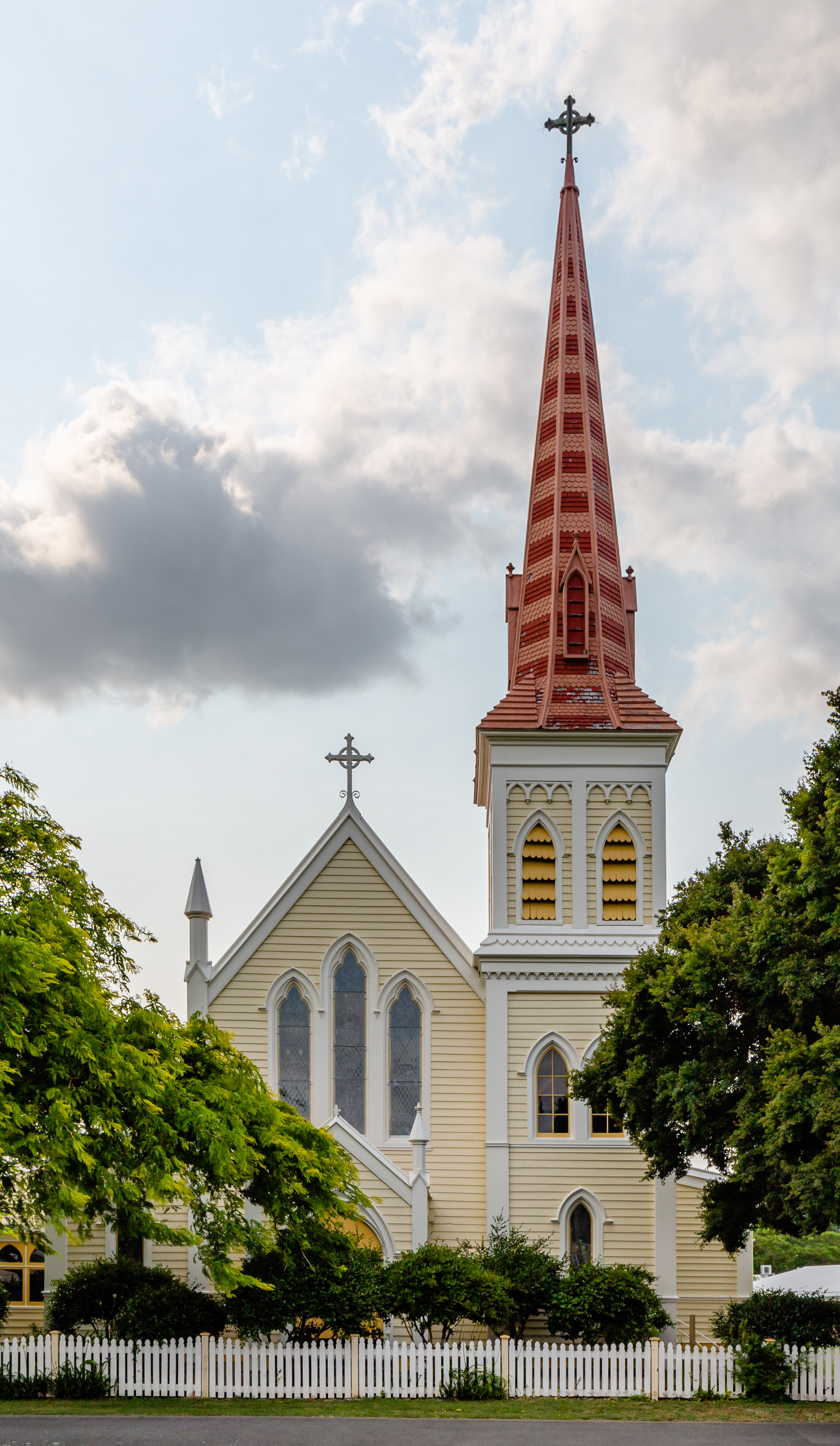
- St Mary's Catholic Church
- Interactive map of Redwoodtown
- Coordinates: 41.528°S 173.954°E
- Country: New Zealand
- City: Blenheim, New Zealand
- Local authority: Marlborough District Council
- Electoral ward: Blenheim General Ward; Marlborough Māori Ward

Area
  - Land: 433 ha (1,070 acres)

Population (June 2025)
  - Total: 10,500
  - Density: 2,420/km^{2} (6,280/sq mi)

Springlands	Blenheim Central
Fairhall	Redwoodtown	Riverlands
	Witherlea

Redwoodtown is a suburb to the south of Blenheim's central business district.

== Demographics ==
Redwoodtown covers 4.33 km^{2} (1.67 sq mi) and had an estimated population of 10,500 as of June 2025, with a population density of 2,425 people per km^{2}.

Historical population
Year	Pop.	±% p.a.
2006	9,384	—
2013	9,555	+0.26%
2018	10,221	+1.36%
2023	10,191	−0.06%
The 2006 population is for a larger area of 5.09 km^{2}. Source:

Redwoodtown had a population of 10,191 in the 2023 New Zealand census, a decrease of 30 people (−0.3%) since the 2018 census, and an increase of 636 people (6.7%) since the 2013 census. There were 4,941 males, 5,223 females, and 27 people of other genders in 4,290 dwellings. 3.0% of people identified as LGBTIQ+. There were 1,713 people (16.8%) aged under 15 years, 1,581 (15.5%) aged 15 to 29, 4,467 (43.8%) aged 30 to 64, and 2,436 (23.9%) aged 65 or older.

People could identify as more than one ethnicity. The results were 80.0% European (Pākehā); 15.7% Māori; 5.8% Pasifika; 8.2% Asian; 2.3% Middle Eastern, Latin American and African New Zealanders (MELAA); and 2.6% other, which includes people giving their ethnicity as "New Zealander". English was spoken by 96.8%, Māori by 3.2%, Samoan by 1.4%, and other languages by 12.1%. No language could be spoken by 1.9% (e.g. too young to talk). New Zealand Sign Language was known by 0.6%. The percentage of people born overseas was 22.5, compared with 28.8% nationally.

Religious affiliations were 33.1% Christian, 1.3% Hindu, 0.4% Islam, 0.6% Māori religious beliefs, 0.8% Buddhist, 0.3% New Age, 0.1% Jewish, and 1.1% other religions. People who answered that they had no religion were 54.2%, and 8.5% of people did not answer the census question.

Of those at least 15 years old, 1,401 (16.5%) people had a bachelor's or higher degree, 4,482 (52.9%) had a post-high school certificate or diploma, and 2,604 (30.7%) people exclusively held high school qualifications. 453 people (5.3%) earned over $100,000 compared to 12.1% nationally. The employment status of those at least 15 was 4,170 (49.2%) full-time, 1,128 (13.3%) part-time, and 171 (2.0%) unemployed.

Individual statistical areas
Name	Area (km^{2})	Population	Density (per km^{2})	Dwellings	Median age	Median income
Whitney West	1.14	2,400	2,105	1,014	42.6 years	$39,900
Whitney East	1.06	2,394	2,258	1,014	43.5 years	$38,900
Redwoodtown West	1.06	2,580	2,434	1,086	43.3 years	$34,900
Redwoodtown East	1.07	2,817	2,633	1,176	41.8 years	$37,200
New Zealand					38.1 years	$41,500

== Education ==
Redwoodtown School is a full primary (years 1-8) school with a roll of 289. It opened in 1912.

Whitney Street School is a state contributing primary (years 1-6) primary school. It has a roll of 345. It opened in 1953.

Richmond View School is a composite school (years 1-13) with a roll of 325. It is a state integrated school with a Christian perspective. It opened in 1981 and became state integrated in 2001 as a full primary school. From 2019 the school extended to cover secondary education, starting with year 9 students and adding another year each year.

All these schools are coeducational. Rolls are as of March 2026.
