= Linkwater =

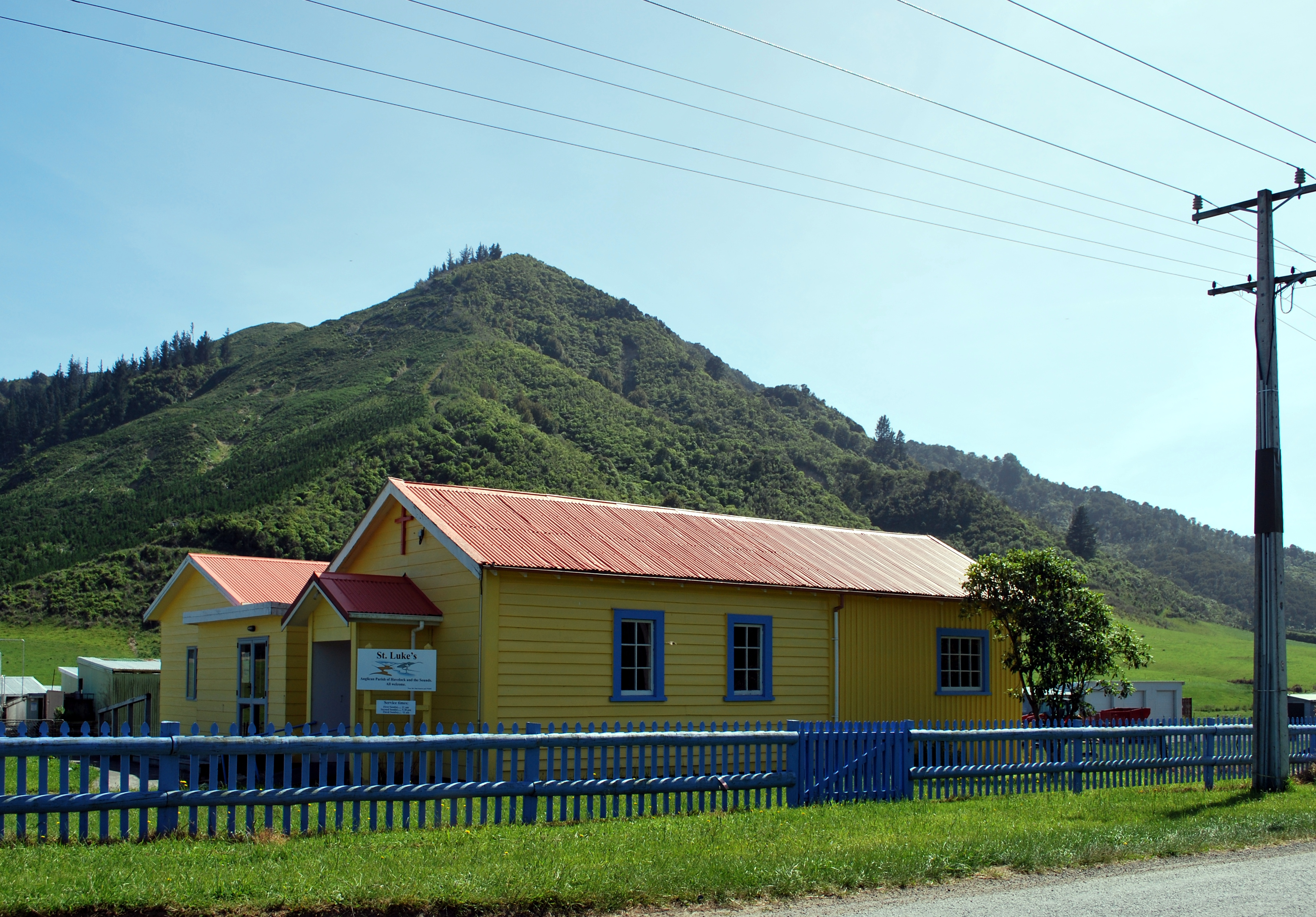
- Interactive map of Linkwater
- Coordinates: 41°17′22″S 173°52′5″E
- Country: New Zealand
- Region: Marlborough
- Ward: Marlborough Sounds General Ward; Marlborough Māori Ward
- Electorates: Kaikōura; Te Tai Tonga (Māori)

Government
  - Territorial Authority: Marlborough District Council
  - Marlborough District Mayor: Nadine Taylor
  - Kaikōura MP: Stuart Smith
  - Te Tai Tonga MP: Tākuta Ferris

Area
  - Total: 72.56 km^{2} (28.02 sq mi)

Population (2023 census)
  - Total: 186
  - Density: 2.56/km^{2} (6.64/sq mi)

Linkwater is a locality in the Marlborough region of New Zealand. Queen Charlotte Drive, the direct route between Havelock to the west and Picton to the east, passes through it. Kenepuru Sound lies to the north and northeast.

== History ==
Linkwater started as a milling town in 1861 due to a stand of kahikatea trees in the area and its proximity to the Marlborough Sounds. When gold was discovered in 1864 at Hall's Creek, the town expanded with three hotels opening. The gold rush resulted in the foundation of Cullensville a few km to the south of Linkwater. Cullensville remains as a ghost town, although the gold was gone by 1867. The last mill closed in the early 1870s.

Dairy farming became the mainstay of the area. The Linkwater Co-operative Dairy Factory was established in 1911, and produced milk, cream and cheese until 1953. Dairy farming is still a major component of the economy, but deer farming and forestry are also important.

== Demographics ==
Linkwater locality covers 72.56 km^{2} (28.02 sq mi). and had an estimated population of as of June 2025, It is part of the larger Marlborough Sounds East statistical area.

Historical population
Year	Pop.	±% p.a.
2006	171	—
2013	177	+0.49%
2018	183	+0.67%
2023	186	+0.33%

Linkwater had a population of 186 in the 2023 New Zealand census, an increase of 3 people (1.6%) since the 2018 census, and an increase of 9 people (5.1%) since the 2013 census. There were 93 males, 87 females, and 3 people of other genders in 93 dwellings. 1.6% of people identified as LGBTIQ+. The median age was 53.8 years (compared with 38.1 years nationally). There were 15 people (8.1%) aged under 15 years, 30 (16.1%) aged 15 to 29, 90 (48.4%) aged 30 to 64, and 48 (25.8%) aged 65 or older.

People could identify as more than one ethnicity. The results were 95.2% European (Pākehā), 16.1% Māori, 1.6% Pasifika, 1.6% Asian, and 3.2% other, which includes people giving their ethnicity as "New Zealander". English was spoken by 100.0%, Māori by 3.2%, and other languages by 3.2%. No language could be spoken by 1.6% (e.g. too young to talk). New Zealand Sign Language was known by 1.6%. The percentage of people born overseas was 12.9, compared with 28.8% nationally.

Religious affiliations were 19.4% Christian, 1.6% Māori religious beliefs, and 3.2% other religions. People who answered that they had no religion were 66.1%, and 9.7% of people did not answer the census question.

Of those at least 15 years old, 18 (10.5%) people had a bachelor's or higher degree, 102 (59.6%) had a post-high school certificate or diploma, and 45 (26.3%) people exclusively held high school qualifications. The median income was $35,100, compared with $41,500 nationally. 12 people (7.0%) earned over $100,000 compared to 12.1% nationally. The employment status of those at least 15 was 75 (43.9%) full-time, 27 (15.8%) part-time, and 3 (1.8%) unemployed.

== Education ==
Linkwater School is a coeducational full primary (years 1-8) school with a decile rating of 8 and a roll of 55 as of July 2026. It opened in 1907 in a building moved from the old Grove School.

Grove School opened in 1892 and closed in 1906. It was on Queen Charlotte Drive near the turnoff to Anakiwa. Cullensville School opened in 1899 and closed in 1906. It was at the end of Cullensville Road, south of Linkwater.
