= Robin Slow =

New Zealand painter (born c. 1948)

- Born: c. 1948; Wairau
- Occupations: Teacher; visual artist
- Known for: paintings and traditional arts

Robin Slow (born c. 1948) is a New Zealand painter of Māori art based in Tākaka and a retired art teacher.

== Early life and family ==
Slow was born in Wairau, Blenheim. He went to primary school in Wairau, where a visiting art teacher Cliff Whiting inspired him with a lesson on a Māori story about the beginning of carving. He later moved to Christchurch and completed his high school education at Christchurch West High School. Then, while working as a commercial artist to support himself, he completed his Diploma of Teaching with an art major at Christchurch Teachers' College.

He is married to his wife Rose, they have two children.

== Teaching ==
Slow moved with his family to Twizel where he began teaching new entrants. In the early 1980s he took up a two-year contract at Golden Bay High School, going on to teach there for a total 31 years. To begin with here he faced resistance to including Māori cultural elements such as kowhaiwhai, but he persisted. Although he retired in 2013, he has continued to teach informally at Onetahua Marae.

== Art ==
Even while teaching fulltime, Slow continued to produce art prolifically, often teaching by day and painting by night, and producing thousands of works through his career. At first these paintings piled up on the studio floor until a family member saw them and organised an exhibition in Wellington.

Since this, his work has been shown in hundreds of solo and group exhibitions throughout New Zealand. In collaboration with Brian Flintoff and Bob Bickerton, the exhibition Ngā Hau Ngākau travelled around the country over the course of several years. One of his solo works was produced for a visit by Queen Beatrix in 2013, and another for the Duke and Duchess of Sussex who visited in 2018.

His visual art is steeped in Māori symbology and mythology. He weaves a strong element of story-telling into his work, often incorporating birds as the original people of the country. He sees the interconnectedness of everything in life as fundamental to Māori art, and painting is the way he makes sense of the world. He has also used his art as a way of "dealing with his own whakapapa" which is unknown.

He cites Onetahua as an influence in his work: "the area, the people, the natural resources and the protection of them, the histories and stories". He also references the influence of Whero O Te Rangi Bailey on his exhibition about Parihaka: an elder at Parihaka and a teacher and weaver, she was known for sharing the history of Parihaka.

Since 1991, Slow worked with the community at Onetahua Marae producing murals, traditional instruments, kowhaiwhai, and carving. He and his wife Rose helped build the wharenui Te Ao Marama. He had overall responsibility for the design and layout of the wharenui. Working with visitors from throughout New Zealand and the world, much of this and subsequent work was completed on a community basis.
