= Rapaura =

Locality in Marlborough, New Zealand

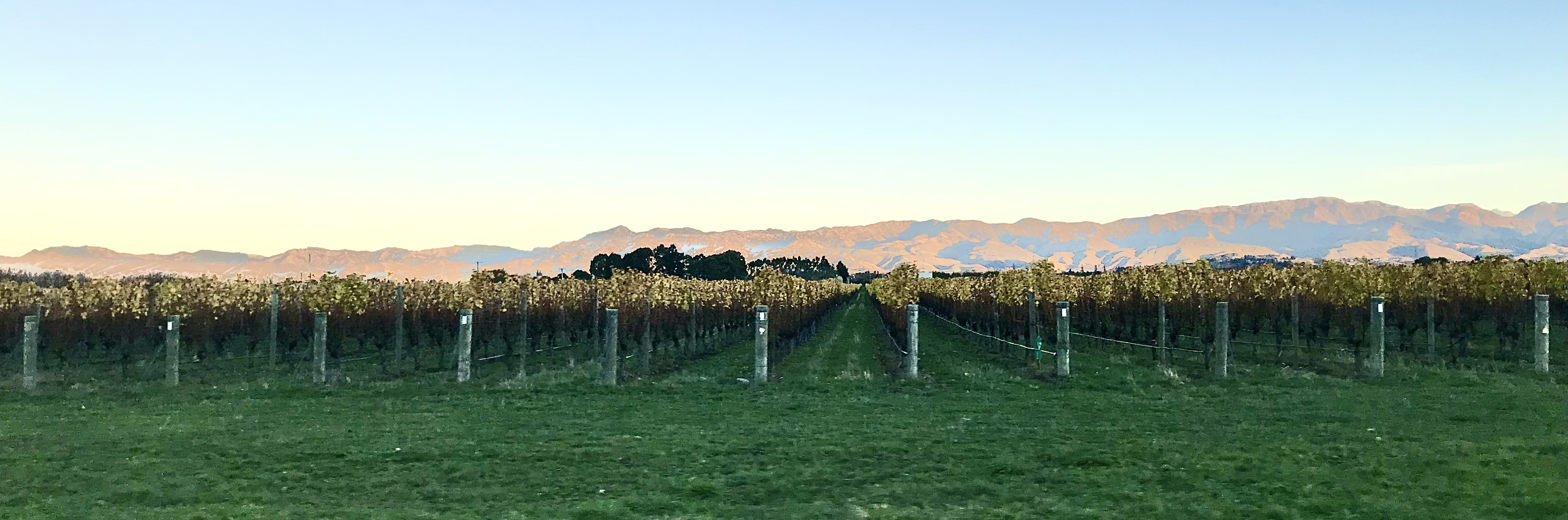
- Vineyard at Rapaura
- Interactive map of Rapaura
- Coordinates: 41°28′19″S 173°54′6″E
- Country: New Zealand
- Region: Marlborough
- Ward: Wairau-Awatere General Ward; Marlborough Māori Ward
- Electorates: Kaikōura; Te Tai Tonga (Māori)

Government
  - Territorial Authority: Marlborough District Council
  - Marlborough District Mayor: Nadine Taylor
  - Kaikōura MP: Stuart Smith
  - Te Tai Tonga MP: Tākuta Ferris

Area
  - Total: 38.39 km^{2} (14.82 sq mi)

Population (2023 census)
  - Total: 456
  - Density: 11.9/km^{2} (30.8/sq mi)

Rapaura is a locality northwest of Blenheim, New Zealand. The Wairau River flows past to the north. Spring Creek lies to the east.

Rapaura consists of a church and a school. It also has high quality land for growing grapes.

== Demographics ==
Rapaura locality covers 38.39 km^{2} (14.82 sq mi). It is part of the larger Lower Wairau statistical area.

Historical population for Rapaura
Year	Pop.	±% p.a.
2006	441	—
2013	435	−0.20%
2018	486	+2.24%
2023	456	−1.27%

Rapaura had a population of 456 in the 2023 New Zealand census, a decrease of 30 people (−6.2%) since the 2018 census, and an increase of 21 people (4.8%) since the 2013 census. There were 237 males and 222 females in 183 dwellings. 1.3% of people identified as LGBTIQ+. There were 69 people (15.1%) aged under 15 years, 60 (13.2%) aged 15 to 29, 225 (49.3%) aged 30 to 64, and 102 (22.4%) aged 65 or older.

People could identify as more than one ethnicity. The results were 94.1% European (Pākehā); 10.5% Māori; 1.3% Pasifika; 2.0% Asian; 1.3% Middle Eastern, Latin American and African New Zealanders (MELAA); and 1.3% other, which includes people giving their ethnicity as "New Zealander". English was spoken by 98.0%, Māori by 2.0%, Samoan by 0.7%, and other languages by 6.6%. No language could be spoken by 0.7% (e.g. too young to talk). New Zealand Sign Language was known by 0.7%. The percentage of people born overseas was 21.1, compared with 28.8% nationally.

Religious affiliations were 29.6% Christian, 0.7% Hindu, 0.7% Māori religious beliefs, 0.7% Buddhist, 0.7% New Age, 0.7% Jewish, and 1.3% other religions. People who answered that they had no religion were 60.5%, and 7.2% of people did not answer the census question.

Of those at least 15 years old, 93 (24.0%) people had a bachelor's or higher degree, 210 (54.3%) had a post-high school certificate or diploma, and 81 (20.9%) people exclusively held high school qualifications. 72 people (18.6%) earned over $100,000 compared to 12.1% nationally. The employment status of those at least 15 was 204 (52.7%) full-time, 81 (20.9%) part-time, and 3 (0.8%) unemployed.

=== Lower Wairau statistical area ===
Lower Wairau statistical area, which also includes Wairau Bar, covers 116.67 km^{2} (45.05 sq mi). Lower Wairau had an estimated population of 1,270 as of June 2025, with a population density of 10.9 people per km^{2}.

Historical population for Lower Wairau
Year	Pop.	±% p.a.
2006	1,176	—
2013	1,167	−0.11%
2018	1,212	+0.76%
2023	1,209	−0.05%

Lower Wairau had a population of 1,209 in the 2023 New Zealand census, a decrease of 3 people (−0.2%) since the 2018 census, and an increase of 42 people (3.6%) since the 2013 census. There were 621 males, 585 females, and 3 people of other genders in 483 dwellings. 2.5% of people identified as LGBTIQ+. The median age was 49.7 years (compared with 38.1 years nationally). There were 195 people (16.1%) aged under 15 years, 135 (11.2%) aged 15 to 29, 609 (50.4%) aged 30 to 64, and 270 (22.3%) aged 65 or older.

People could identify as more than one ethnicity. The results were 90.6% European (Pākehā); 11.9% Māori; 1.0% Pasifika; 2.2% Asian; 1.7% Middle Eastern, Latin American and African New Zealanders (MELAA); and 3.5% other, which includes people giving their ethnicity as "New Zealander". English was spoken by 97.5%, Māori by 3.0%, Samoan by 0.2%, and other languages by 7.2%. No language could be spoken by 1.2% (e.g. too young to talk). New Zealand Sign Language was known by 0.2%. The percentage of people born overseas was 16.1, compared with 28.8% nationally.

Religious affiliations were 29.3% Christian, 0.2% Hindu, 0.2% Māori religious beliefs, 0.5% Buddhist, 0.2% New Age, 0.2% Jewish, and 1.2% other religions. People who answered that they had no religion were 60.0%, and 8.2% of people did not answer the census question.

Of those at least 15 years old, 204 (20.1%) people had a bachelor's or higher degree, 588 (58.0%) had a post-high school certificate or diploma, and 222 (21.9%) people exclusively held high school qualifications. The median income was $50,300, compared with $41,500 nationally. 183 people (18.0%) earned over $100,000 compared to 12.1% nationally. The employment status of those at least 15 was 534 (52.7%) full-time, 213 (21.0%) part-time, and 6 (0.6%) unemployed.

== Education ==
Rapaura School is a coeducational full primary (years 1-8) school with a roll of 107 students (as of July 2026). The school opened in 1862.
