= Fairhall =

Locality in Marlborough, New Zealand

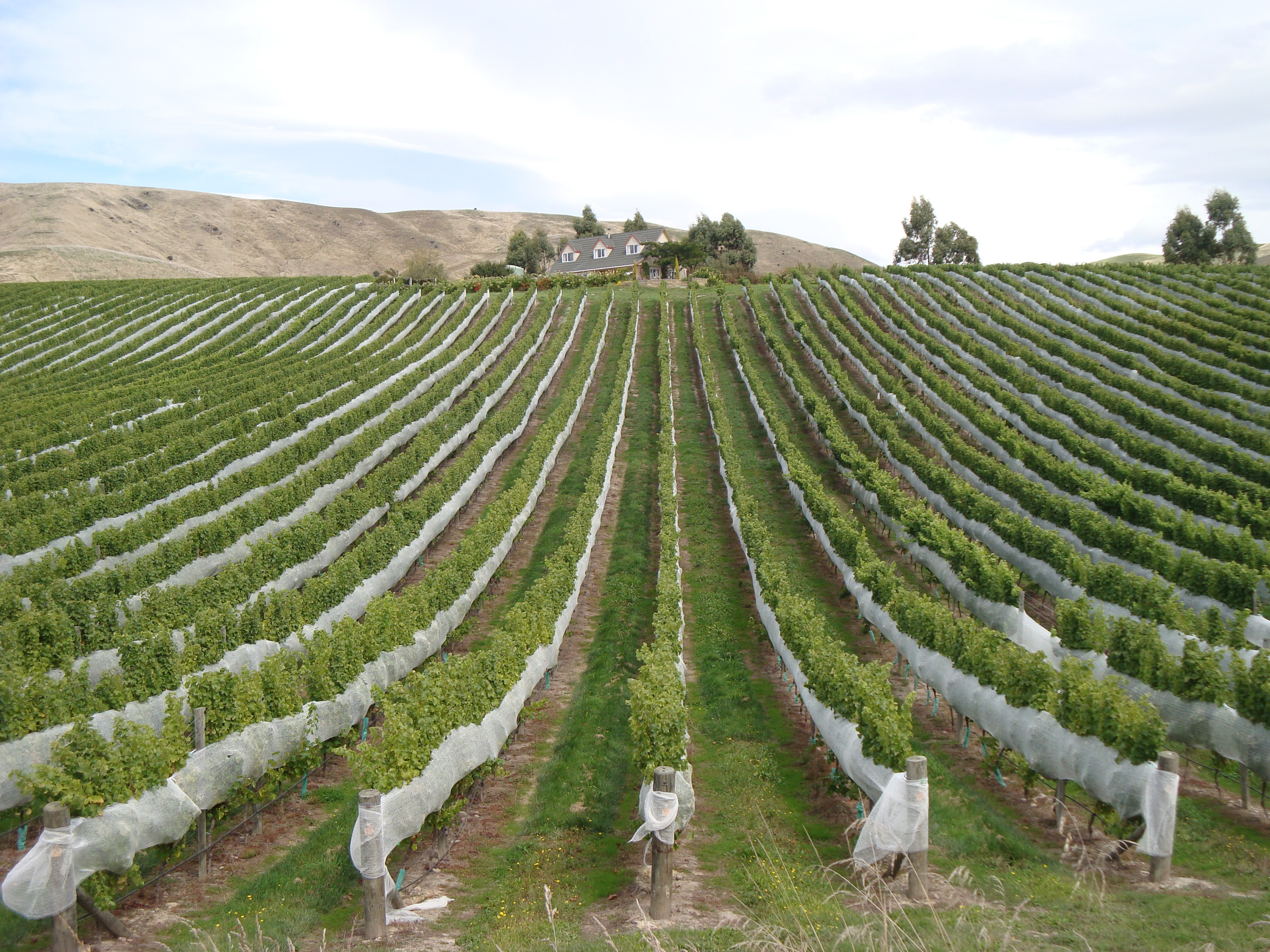
- A vineyard in Fairhall, with Woodbourne Homestead in the background
- Interactive map of Fairhall
- Coordinates: 41°31′47″S 173°52′41″E
- Country: New Zealand
- Region: Marlborough
- Ward: Wairau-Awatere General Ward; Marlborough Māori Ward
- Electorates: Kaikōura; Te Tai Tonga (Māori)

Government
  - Territorial Authority: Marlborough District Council
  - Marlborough District Mayor: Nadine Taylor
  - Kaikōura MP: Stuart Smith
  - Te Tai Tonga MP: Tākuta Ferris

Area
  - Total: 18.15 km^{2} (7.01 sq mi)

Population (2023)
  - Total: 516
  - Density: 28.4/km^{2} (73.6/sq mi)

Fairhall is a locality in Marlborough, New Zealand. Blenheim is about 7.5 km to the northeast. The Fairhall River runs past to the west.

The river and locality were named in 1847 for a chainman in a survey team in the area.

== Demographics ==
Fairhall covers 18.15 km^{2} (7.01 sq mi) and is part of the Woodbourne statistical area.

Historical population
Year	Pop.	±% p.a.
2006	291	—
2013	360	+3.09%
2018	432	+3.71%
2023	516	+3.62%
The 2006 population is for a larger area of 20.27 km^{2}. Source:

Fairhall, including the subdivision of Marlborough Ridge, had a population of 516 in the 2023 New Zealand census, an increase of 84 people (19.4%) since the 2018 census, and an increase of 156 people (43.3%) since the 2013 census. There were 249 males and 261 females in 201 dwellings. 2.9% of people identified as LGBTIQ+. There were 87 people (16.9%) aged under 15 years, 36 (7.0%) aged 15 to 29, 231 (44.8%) aged 30 to 64, and 156 (30.2%) aged 65 or older.

People could identify as more than one ethnicity. The results were 93.6% European (Pākehā); 5.2% Māori; 0.6% Pasifika; 3.5% Asian; 1.2% Middle Eastern, Latin American and African New Zealanders (MELAA); and 1.2% other, which includes people giving their ethnicity as "New Zealander". English was spoken by 98.3%, Māori by 1.2%, and other languages by 8.7%. No language could be spoken by 0.6% (e.g. too young to talk). New Zealand Sign Language was known by 0.6%. The percentage of people born overseas was 24.4, compared with 28.8% nationally.

Religious affiliations were 34.9% Christian, 0.6% Islam, 1.7% Buddhist, and 0.6% Jewish. People who answered that they had no religion were 54.1%, and 7.0% of people did not answer the census question.

Of those at least 15 years old, 174 (40.6%) people had a bachelor's or higher degree, 186 (43.4%) had a post-high school certificate or diploma, and 54 (12.6%) people exclusively held high school qualifications. 114 people (26.6%) earned over $100,000 compared to 12.1% nationally. The employment status of those at least 15 was 192 (44.8%) full-time and 81 (18.9%) part-time.

== Education ==
Fairhall School is a coeducational full primary (years 1-8) school with a roll of 187 students (as of July 2026). The school opened in 1877.
