= Grovetown, New Zealand =

Town in Marlborough, New Zealand

Grovetown
- Interactive map of Grovetown
- Coordinates: 41°28′52″S 173°58′5″E
- Country: New Zealand
- Region: Marlborough
- Ward: Wairau-Awatere General Ward; Marlborough Māori Ward
- Electorates: Kaikōura; Te Tai Tonga (Māori)

Government
  - Territorial Authority: Marlborough District Council
  - Marlborough District Mayor: Nadine Taylor
  - Kaikōura MP: Stuart Smith
  - Te Tai Tonga MP: Tākuta Ferris

Area
  - Total: 2.89 km^{2} (1.12 sq mi)

Population (June 2025)
  - Total: 390
  - Density: 130/km^{2} (350/sq mi)
- Postcode(s): 7202

Grovetown is a small town in Marlborough, New Zealand. State Highway 1 runs past the settlement to the west, and the Wairau River flows past to the northeast. Spring Creek is about 2.5 km to the north, and Blenheim is about 3.5 km to the south. To the east is Grovetown Lagoon, an oxbow loop of the Wairau River. The settlement had a usual resident population of 357 at the 2018 New Zealand census.

Tua Mātene Marae is located in Grovetown. It is a marae (meeting ground) of Rangitāne o Wairau and includes Te Huataki wharenui (meeting house).

== Demographics ==
Grovetown is described by Statistics New Zealand as a rural settlement. It covers 2.89 km^{2} (1.12 sq mi) and had an estimated population of 390 as of June 2025, with a population density of 135 people per km^{2}. Grovetown is part of the Spring Creek-Grovetown statistical area.

Historical population
Year	Pop.	±% p.a.
2006	297	—
2013	300	+0.14%
2018	357	+3.54%
2023	390	+1.78%

Grovetown had a population of 390 in the 2023 New Zealand census, an increase of 33 people (9.2%) since the 2018 census, and an increase of 90 people (30.0%) since the 2013 census. There were 198 males and 189 females in 135 dwellings. 2.3% of people identified as LGBTIQ+. The median age was 42.9 years (compared with 38.1 years nationally). There were 72 people (18.5%) aged under 15 years, 57 (14.6%) aged 15 to 29, 195 (50.0%) aged 30 to 64, and 66 (16.9%) aged 65 or older.

People could identify as more than one ethnicity. The results were 90.0% European (Pākehā); 14.6% Māori; 1.5% Pasifika; 4.6% Asian; 1.5% Middle Eastern, Latin American and African New Zealanders (MELAA); and 4.6% other, which includes people giving their ethnicity as "New Zealander". English was spoken by 98.5%, Māori by 0.8%, and other languages by 6.2%. No language could be spoken by 1.5% (e.g. too young to talk). The percentage of people born overseas was 14.6, compared with 28.8% nationally.

Religious affiliations were 22.3% Christian, 0.8% Hindu, 0.8% Buddhist, and 2.3% other religions. People who answered that they had no religion were 63.8%, and 10.0% of people did not answer the census question.

Of those at least 15 years old, 51 (16.0%) people had a bachelor's or higher degree, 186 (58.5%) had a post-high school certificate or diploma, and 72 (22.6%) people exclusively held high school qualifications. The median income was $44,200, compared with $41,500 nationally. 33 people (10.4%) earned over $100,000 compared to 12.1% nationally. The employment status of those at least 15 was 177 (55.7%) full-time, 45 (14.2%) part-time, and 6 (1.9%) unemployed.

== Education ==
Grovetown School is a coeducational contributing primary (years 1-6) school with a roll of 64 students (as of March 2026). The school was established in 1866.
