= Riverlands =

Locality in Marlborough, New Zealand

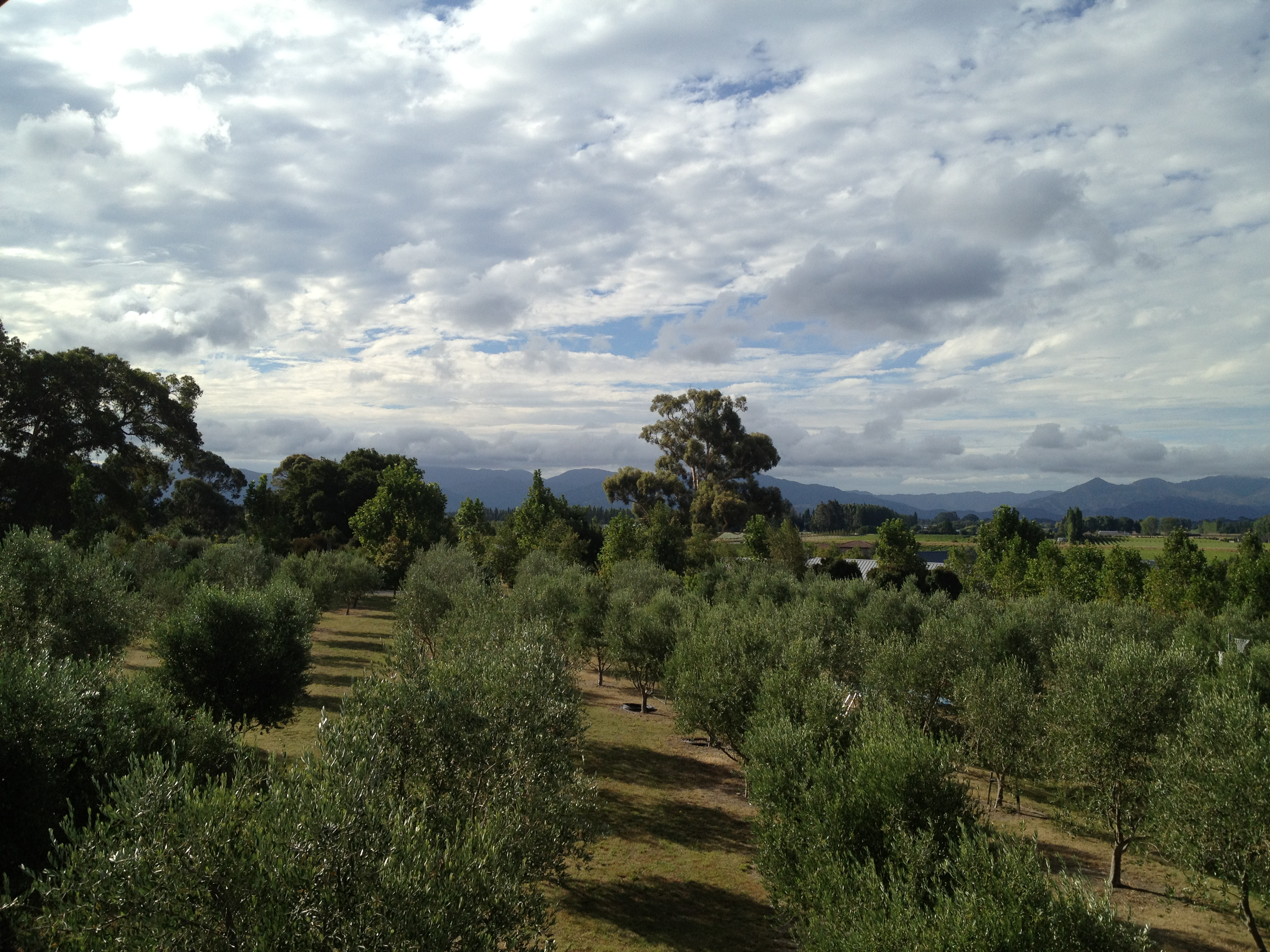
- An olive garden in Riverlands
- Interactive map of Riverlands
- Coordinates: 41°31′20″S 173°58′57″E
- Country: New Zealand
- Region: Marlborough
- Ward: Blenheim General Ward; Wairau-Awatere General Ward; Marlborough Māori Ward
- Electorates: Kaikōura; Te Tai Tonga (Māori)

Government
  - Territorial Authority: Marlborough District Council
  - Marlborough District Mayor: Nadine Taylor
  - Kaikōura MP: Stuart Smith
  - Te Tai Tonga MP: Tākuta Ferris

Area
  - Total: 6.28 km^{2} (2.42 sq mi)

Population (June 2025)
  - Total: 700
  - Density: 110/km^{2} (290/sq mi)

Riverlands is a locality in Marlborough, New Zealand. State Highway 1 runs through the settlement, and the Ōpaoa River flows past to the northeast. Blenheim is about 2.5 km to the northwest.

According to the 2013 New Zealand census, Riverlands has a population of 471, an increase of 9 people since the 2006 census. There were 231 males and 240 females.

== Demographics ==
Riverlands covers 6.28 km^{2} (2.42 sq mi). It had an estimated population of 700 as of June 2025, with a population density of 111 people per km^{2}.

Historical population
Year	Pop.	±% p.a.
2006	390	—
2013	405	+0.54%
2018	465	+2.80%
2023	543	+3.15%

Riverlands had a population of 543 in the 2023 New Zealand census, an increase of 78 people (16.8%) since the 2018 census, and an increase of 138 people (34.1%) since the 2013 census. There were 294 males and 249 females in 174 dwellings. 1.7% of people identified as LGBTIQ+. The median age was 42.2 years (compared with 38.1 years nationally). There were 84 people (15.5%) aged under 15 years, 99 (18.2%) aged 15 to 29, 267 (49.2%) aged 30 to 64, and 93 (17.1%) aged 65 or older.

People could identify as more than one ethnicity. The results were 82.9% European (Pākehā); 12.2% Māori; 9.9% Pasifika; 3.9% Asian; 2.2% Middle Eastern, Latin American and African New Zealanders (MELAA); and 3.3% other, which includes people giving their ethnicity as "New Zealander". English was spoken by 97.8%, Māori by 1.1%, Samoan by 3.3%, and other languages by 10.5%. No language could be spoken by 0.6% (e.g. too young to talk). The percentage of people born overseas was 23.2, compared with 28.8% nationally.

Religious affiliations were 30.9% Christian, 1.7% Hindu, 1.1% Islam, 0.6% Buddhist, 0.6% Jewish, and 0.6% other religions. People who answered that they had no religion were 58.0%, and 7.7% of people did not answer the census question.

Of those at least 15 years old, 99 (21.6%) people had a bachelor's or higher degree, 246 (53.6%) had a post-high school certificate or diploma, and 114 (24.8%) people exclusively held high school qualifications. The median income was $47,600, compared with $41,500 nationally. 75 people (16.3%) earned over $100,000 compared to 12.1% nationally. The employment status of those at least 15 was 282 (61.4%) full-time, 81 (17.6%) part-time, and 3 (0.7%) unemployed.

== Education ==
Riverlands School is a coeducational full primary (years 1-8) school with a roll of 175 students as of July 2026. It opened in 1906 and celebrated its centenary in 2006.

== Climate ==
Climate data for Riverlands (1971–2000)
Month	Jan	Feb	Mar	Apr	May	Jun	Jul	Aug	Sep	Oct	Nov	Dec	Year
Mean daily maximum °C (°F)	23.0 (73.4)	22.6 (72.7)	21.3 (70.3)	18.6 (65.5)	16.0 (60.8)	13.4 (56.1)	12.8 (55.0)	13.5 (56.3)	15.7 (60.3)	17.7 (63.9)	19.3 (66.7)	21.2 (70.2)	17.9 (64.3)
Daily mean °C (°F)	17.2 (63.0)	16.9 (62.4)	15.7 (60.3)	12.9 (55.2)	10.2 (50.4)	7.7 (45.9)	7.2 (45.0)	8.2 (46.8)	10.4 (50.7)	12.3 (54.1)	13.8 (56.8)	15.7 (60.3)	12.4 (54.2)
Mean daily minimum °C (°F)	11.4 (52.5)	11.2 (52.2)	10.1 (50.2)	7.2 (45.0)	4.4 (39.9)	2.0 (35.6)	1.6 (34.9)	2.9 (37.2)	5.1 (41.2)	6.9 (44.4)	8.3 (46.9)	10.2 (50.4)	6.8 (44.2)
Average rainfall mm (inches)	49 (1.9)	31 (1.2)	52 (2.0)	59 (2.3)	65 (2.6)	52 (2.0)	63 (2.5)	60 (2.4)	42 (1.7)	47 (1.9)	44 (1.7)	41 (1.6)	605 (23.8)
Mean monthly sunshine hours	244.0	218.7	180.7	155.6	152.8	132.1	145.1	153.1	173.7	200.2	213.2	221.8	2,191
Source: NIWA (rainfall 1951–1980)
