= Blenheim, New Zealand =

Town in Marlborough, New Zealand

Blenheim Waiharakeke (Māori)
- Urban area
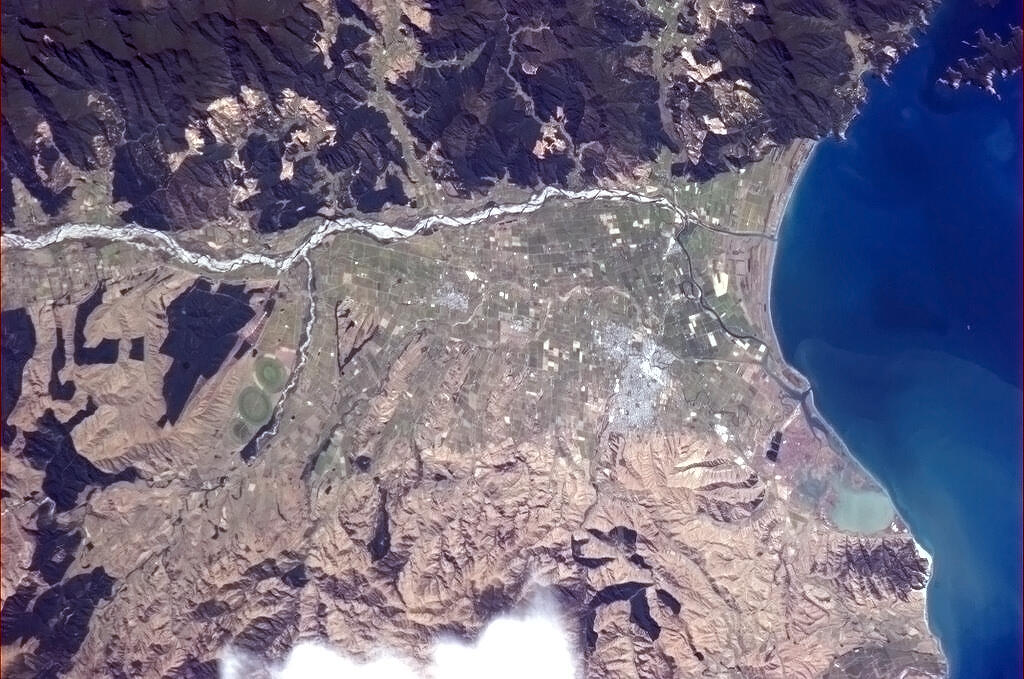
- Blenheim pictured from the International Space Station (ISS)

- Location within New Zealand
- Coordinates: 41.514°S 173.960°E
- Country: New Zealand
- Region: Marlborough
- Territorial authority: Marlborough District
- Established: 1850s
- Named for: Battle of Blenheim
- Member of Parliament: Stuart Smith, Kaikoura Electorate
- Suburbs: List: Blenheim; Burleigh; Farnham; Fairhall; Grovetown; Islington; Mayfield; Omaka; Redwoodtown; Renwick; Riverlands; Riversdale; Roselands; Solar Heights; Spring Creek; Springlands; St Andrews; Witherlea; Wither Hills; Wither Rise; Woodbourne; Yelverton

Government
  - Mayor: Nadine Taylor

Area
  - Total: 27.46 km^{2} (10.60 sq mi)

Population (June 2025)
  - Total: 29,800
  - Density: 1,090/km^{2} (2,810/sq mi)
- Postcode: 7201
- Area code: 03

Blenheim (/ˈblɛnɪm/ BLEN-im; Māori: Waiharakeke) is the most populous town in the region of Marlborough, in the north east of the South Island of New Zealand. It has an estimated population of 29,800 as of June 2025. The surrounding Marlborough wine region is well known as the centre of the New Zealand wine industry. It enjoys one of New Zealand's sunniest climates, with warm, relatively dry summers and cool, crisp winters.

Blenheim is named after the Battle of Blenheim (1704) in the War of the Spanish Succession, where troops led by John Churchill, 1st Duke of Marlborough defeated a combined French and Bavarian force. The New Zealand Ministry for Culture and Heritage gives a translation of "flax stream" for the town's Māori name, Waiharakeke.

== History ==
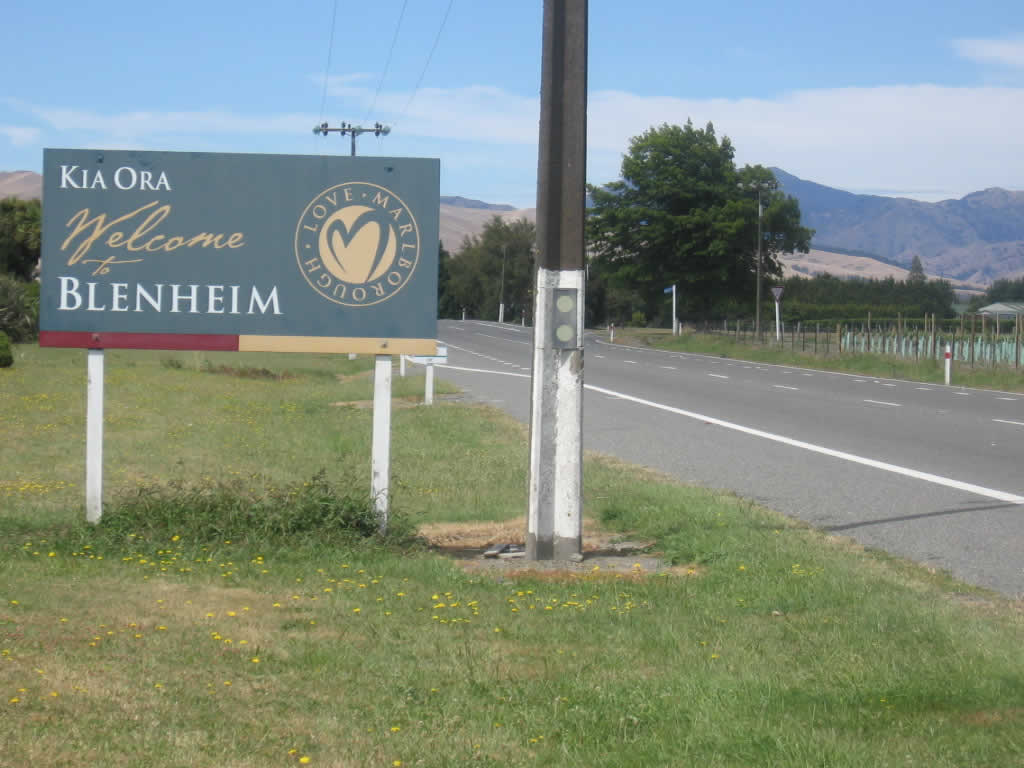
"Kia Ora Welcome to Blenheim"

The sheltered coastal bays of Marlborough supported a small Māori population possibly as early as the 12th century. Archaeological evidence dates Polynesian human remains uncovered at Wairau Bar to the 13th century. The rich sea and bird life of the area would easily have supported such small communities. As the Māori population of the area increased, they developed the land to sustain the growing population. In the early 1700s canals and waterways were dug among the natural river courses, allowing for the first forms of farming in the area including that of fish and native water fowl. A total of approximately 18 km of channels are known to have been excavated before the arrival of European settlers. Māori in the Marlborough Region also cultivated crops, including kūmara (sweet potato).

The area is also home to the first serious clash of arms between Māori and the British settlers after the signing of the Treaty of Waitangi. The Wairau Affray which occurred in what is now the village of Tuamarina.

The settlement was originally known to Europeans as The Beaver or Beaverton due to its frequent flooding.

Although the early history of Marlborough was closely associated with the Nelson settlement, the people of Marlborough desired independence from Nelson. In 1859, nineteen years after the original Nelson settlement, the request of Marlborough settlers was granted, and Marlborough became a separate province. Although gold was discovered in the province in the early 1860s the resulting boom did not last, and while the gold rush helped to expand the region, it was the development of pastoralism which provided the greatest long-term benefits. Marlborough squatters developed huge sheep runs that dominated the countryside, rivalling Canterbury's sheep stations in size and wealth.

== Geography ==
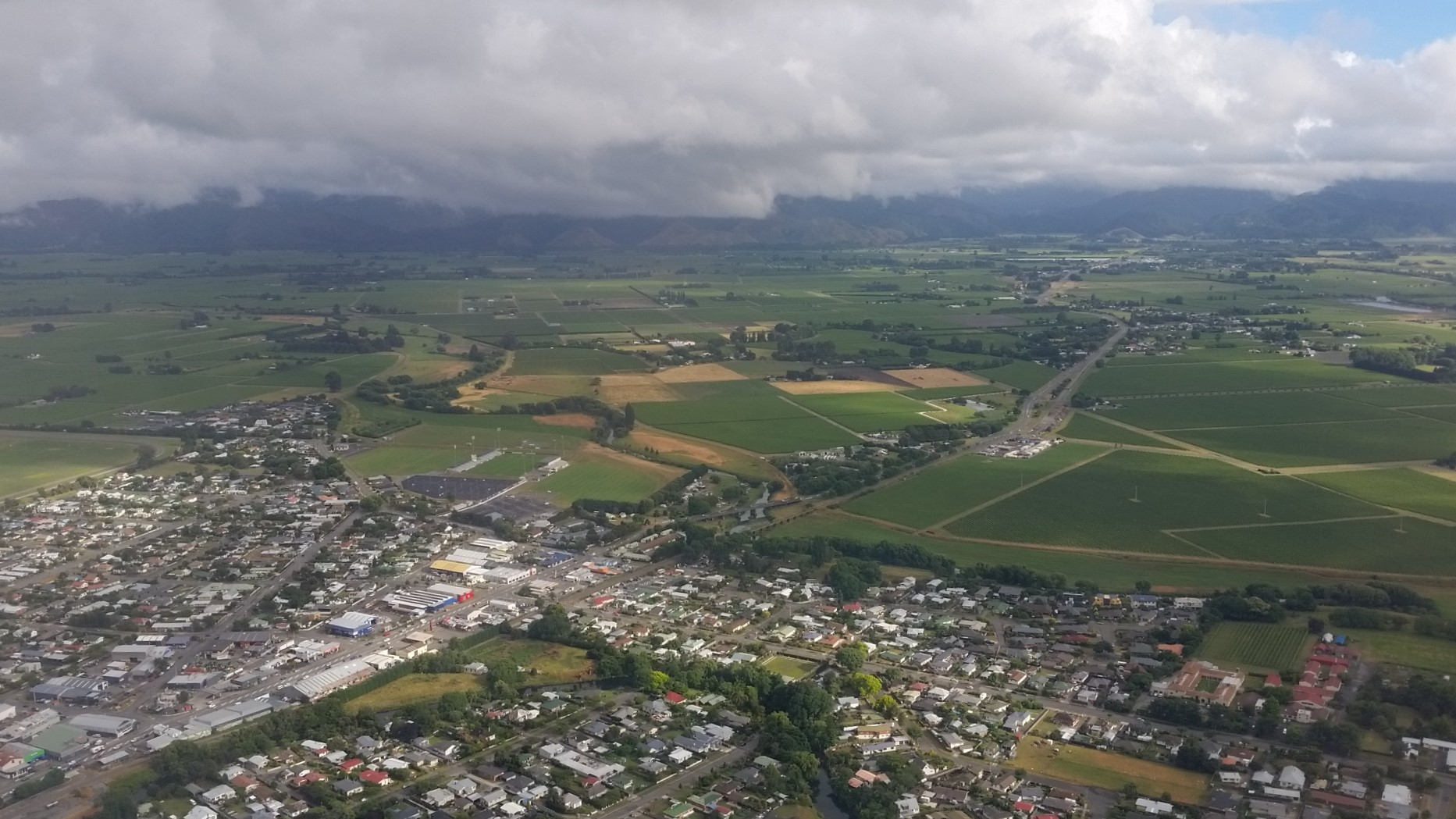
View from above looking north from Blenheim

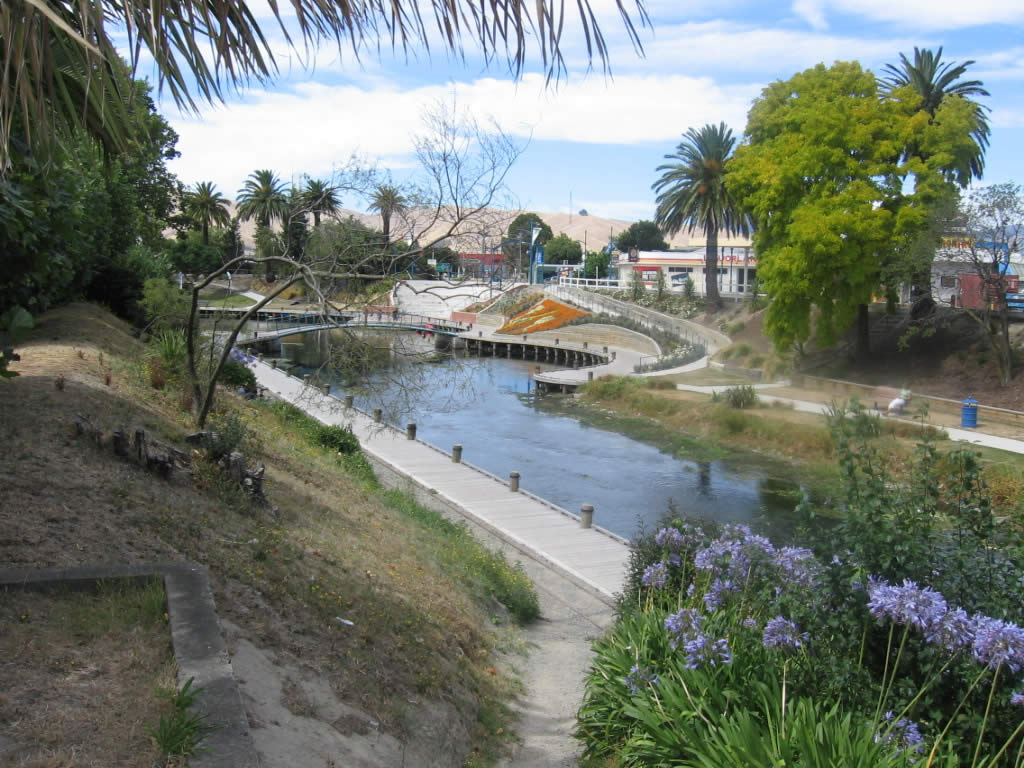
The Taylor River in central Blenheim

Situated on the Wairau Plain, the town is mostly flat with only its southernmost fringe rising to the base of the Wither Hills. As the plain is surrounded by mountains on all but the eastern flank, which is open to Cook Strait, it is relatively well protected from the frequent southerly weather fronts occurring during winters. The area does however experience some high wind events during the course of the year, especially from the west where the wind is funnelled down the Wairau Valley directly at the town. Open and exposed areas in and around Blenheim are also hit quite hard by winds blowing inland from Cook Strait. Blenheim sits at the confluence of the Taylor and Ōpaoa rivers. It is in a tectonically active zone and experiences several (usually small) earthquakes each year. The boundary between the Pacific plate (on which Blenheim sits) and the Indo-Australian plate passes just north of Blenheim. It lies east of Renwick, and just south of Spring Creek.

=== Climate ===
The climate is generally very settled, largely due to the rain shadow effect of the mountain ranges to the west which shelter Blenheim from the heaviest of rains that hit the western part of the South Island.

Summers are typically warm, dry and sunny. Winter mornings are cool and frosty. Snowfall is rare as the town is sheltered from cold southerly weather by the mountain ranges to the south. Rainfall and humidity is highest in winter and early spring, between June and October. The town's average annual rainfall is a little more than 700mm, with 81.5 precipitation days.

Thunderstorms are an uncommon occurrence due to the sheltered climate. There is a higher likelihood in summer, when afternoon heating can generate a buildup of clouds above the ranges.

The highest recorded temperature is 37.8 °C, recorded on 7 February 1973. The lowest is −8.8 °C.

Climate data for Blenheim (1991–2020 normals, extremes 1932–present)
| Month | Jan | Feb | Mar | Apr | May | Jun | Jul | Aug | Sep | Oct | Nov | Dec | Year |
|---|---|---|---|---|---|---|---|---|---|---|---|---|---|
| Record high °C (°F) | 36.5 (97.7) | 37.8 (100.0) | 32.7 (90.9) | 28.8 (83.8) | 24.4 (75.9) | 22.0 (71.6) | 19.8 (67.6) | 23.8 (74.8) | 27.6 (81.7) | 30.2 (86.4) | 32.8 (91.0) | 34.2 (93.6) | 37.8 (100.0) |
| Mean daily maximum °C (°F) | 23.4 (74.1) | 23.3 (73.9) | 21.5 (70.7) | 18.8 (65.8) | 16.6 (61.9) | 13.9 (57.0) | 13.3 (55.9) | 14.4 (57.9) | 16.3 (61.3) | 18.4 (65.1) | 19.9 (67.8) | 21.8 (71.2) | 18.5 (65.3) |
| Daily mean °C (°F) | 18.1 (64.6) | 17.9 (64.2) | 16.1 (61.0) | 13.5 (56.3) | 11.2 (52.2) | 8.8 (47.8) | 8.1 (46.6) | 9.2 (48.6) | 11.2 (52.2) | 13.1 (55.6) | 14.7 (58.5) | 16.8 (62.2) | 13.2 (55.8) |
| Mean daily minimum °C (°F) | 12.9 (55.2) | 12.5 (54.5) | 10.7 (51.3) | 8.2 (46.8) | 5.9 (42.6) | 3.6 (38.5) | 2.9 (37.2) | 4.0 (39.2) | 6.2 (43.2) | 7.9 (46.2) | 9.6 (49.3) | 11.8 (53.2) | 8.0 (46.4) |
| Record low °C (°F) | 1.3 (34.3) | −0.1 (31.8) | −1.1 (30.0) | −4.1 (24.6) | −5.3 (22.5) | −8.8 (16.2) | −6.1 (21.0) | −6.2 (20.8) | −4.0 (24.8) | −3.6 (25.5) | −2.9 (26.8) | −0.3 (31.5) | −8.8 (16.2) |
| Average rainfall mm (inches) | 43.0 (1.69) | 44.6 (1.76) | 39.4 (1.55) | 53.8 (2.12) | 56.9 (2.24) | 68.6 (2.70) | 64.2 (2.53) | 57.9 (2.28) | 54.4 (2.14) | 57.2 (2.25) | 49.1 (1.93) | 49.7 (1.96) | 638.8 (25.15) |
| Average rainy days (≥ 1.0 mm) | 4.8 | 4.2 | 4.7 | 5.8 | 7.0 | 7.6 | 7.2 | 7.6 | 7.4 | 7.2 | 6.3 | 6.1 | 75.9 |
| Average relative humidity (%) | 68.7 | 74.2 | 74.9 | 77.5 | 81.5 | 82.3 | 83.7 | 80.8 | 73.3 | 72.1 | 67.7 | 67.5 | 75.4 |
| Mean monthly sunshine hours | 261.8 | 233.4 | 233.3 | 190.4 | 178.9 | 151.8 | 160.0 | 189.2 | 198.8 | 232.6 | 242.7 | 248.5 | 2,521.4 |
| Percentage possible sunshine | 57 | 60 | 61 | 58 | 59 | 56 | 54 | 54 | 56 | 57 | 56 | 53 | 57 |
Source 1: NIWA Climate Data (humidity 1981–2010
Source 2: Weather Spark

== Demographics ==
The Blenheim urban area, which Stats NZ describes as a medium urban area, covers 27.46 km^{2} (10.60 sq mi) and incorporates thirteen statistical areas. It had an estimated population of 29,800 as of June 2025, with a population density of 1,085 people per km^{2}.

Historical population
| Year | Pop. | ±% p.a. |
|---|---|---|
| 2006 | 23,694 | — |
| 2013 | 25,242 | +0.91% |
| 2018 | 27,648 | +1.84% |
| 2023 | 28,788 | +0.81% |
The 2006 population is for a smaller area of 17.20 km^{2}. Source:

Blenheim had a population of 28,788 in the 2023 New Zealand census, an increase of 1,140 people (4.1%) since the 2018 census, and an increase of 3,546 people (14.0%) since the 2013 census. There were 14,043 males, 14,652 females, and 93 people of other genders in 11,583 dwellings. 2.7% of people identified as LGBTIQ+. The median age was 43.2 years (compared with 38.1 years nationally). There were 4,917 people (17.1%) aged under 15 years, 4,467 (15.5%) aged 15 to 29, 12,561 (43.6%) aged 30 to 64, and 6,843 (23.8%) aged 65 or older.

People could identify as more than one ethnicity. The results were 82.5% European (Pākehā); 15.0% Māori; 4.9% Pasifika; 7.4% Asian; 2.1% Middle Eastern, Latin American and African New Zealanders (MELAA); and 2.7% other, which includes people giving their ethnicity as "New Zealander". English was spoken by 96.9%, Māori by 2.8%, Samoan by 1.1%, and other languages by 11.2%. No language could be spoken by 1.8% (e.g. too young to talk). New Zealand Sign Language was known by 0.5%. The percentage of people born overseas was 21.4, compared with 28.8% nationally.

Religious affiliations were 33.0% Christian, 1.1% Hindu, 0.4% Islam, 0.6% Māori religious beliefs, 0.9% Buddhist, 0.3% New Age, 0.1% Jewish, and 1.2% other religions. People who answered that they had no religion were 54.8%, and 7.8% of people did not answer the census question.

Of those at least 15 years old, 4,212 (17.6%) people had a bachelor's or higher degree, 12,951 (54.3%) had a post-high school certificate or diploma, and 6,711 (28.1%) people exclusively held high school qualifications. The median income was $38,700, compared with $41,500 nationally. 1,782 people (7.5%) earned over $100,000 compared to 12.1% nationally. The employment status of those at least 15 was 11,835 (49.6%) full-time, 3,318 (13.9%) part-time, and 420 (1.8%) unemployed.

Individual statistical areas
| Name | Area (km^{2}) | Population | Density (per km^{2}) | Dwellings | Median age | Median income |
|---|---|---|---|---|---|---|
| Springlands | 2.75 | 3,585 | 1,304 | 1,341 | 48.8 years | $38,400 |
| Yelverton | 2.55 | 2,505 | 982 | 1,056 | 49.0 years | $36,200 |
| Mayfield | 1.46 | 1,689 | 1,157 | 738 | 39.3 years | $36,700 |
| Whitney West | 1.14 | 2,400 | 2,105 | 1,014 | 42.6 years | $39,900 |
| Burleigh | 3.62 | 984 | 272 | 351 | 37.0 years | $49,100 |
| Blenheim Central | 1.55 | 1,200 | 774 | 498 | 36.2 years | $35,800 |
| Riversdale-Islington | 1.10 | 2,322 | 2,111 | 870 | 39.7 years | $38,600 |
| Whitney East | 1.06 | 2,394 | 2,258 | 1,014 | 43.5 years | $38,900 |
| Redwoodtown West | 1.06 | 2,580 | 2,434 | 1,086 | 43.3 years | $34,900 |
| Witherlea West | 2.44 | 2,952 | 1,210 | 1,164 | 46.8 years | $40,500 |
| Redwoodtown East | 1.07 | 2,817 | 2,633 | 1,176 | 41.8 years | $37,200 |
| Riverlands | 6.28 | 543 | 86 | 174 | 42.2 years | $47,600 |
| Witherlea East | 1.37 | 2,805 | 2,047 | 1,101 | 42.9 years | $41,700 |
| New Zealand | | | | | 38.1 years | $41,500 |

== Suburbs ==
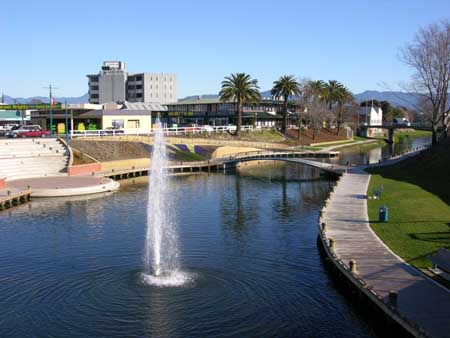
The Taylor River Geyser

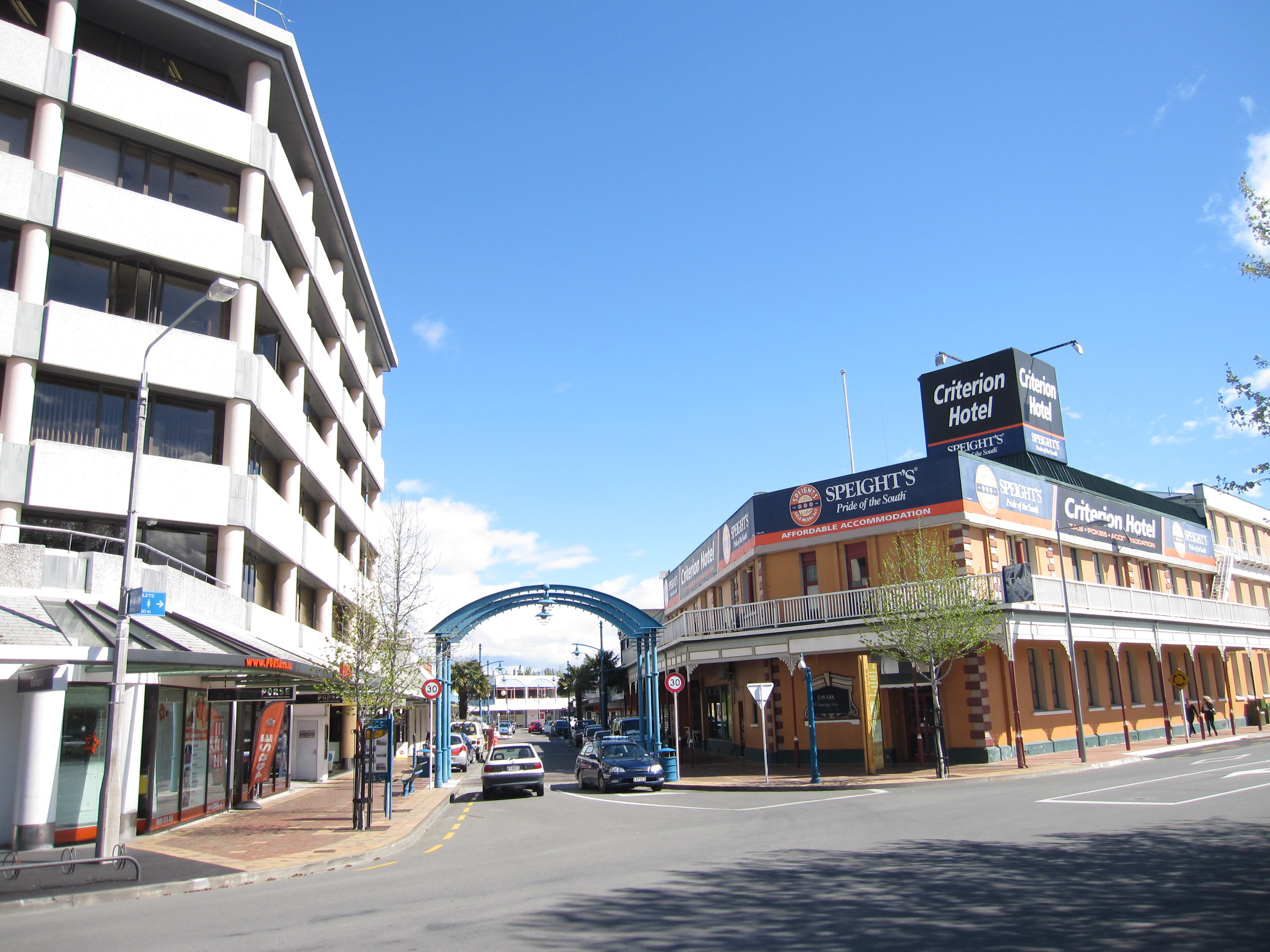
Central business district of Blenheim in 2012

- Inner suburbs:
  - Blenheim CBD
  - Burleigh
  - Farnham
  - Islington
  - Mayfield
  - Redwoodtown
  - Riversdale
  - Roselands
  - Solar Heights
  - Springlands
  - St Andrews
  - Witherlea
  - Wither Hills
  - Wither Rise
  - Yelverton
- Outer suburbs:
  - Fairhall
  - Grovetown
  - Omaka
  - Renwick
  - Riverlands
  - Spring Creek
  - Woodbourne

== Economy ==
The town's economy is based on agricultural services, with pastoral and horticultural farming providing a major source of income. Historically, sheep farming, dairying, and wheat and barley were the major activities in the area. Marlborough's first commercial grape vines were planted in 1973, and since then viticulture has become the dominant industry in the region; employment is derived not only from the production of wine, but also from 'wine tourism' in the area. Olive growing has also gained some importance in recent years. Despite being located several kilometres inland, maritime industries are also important sources of employment for Blenheim. Lake Grassmere has New Zealand's only salt works, producing 50% of the country's total salt requirement. Fishing and mussel farming are also important in the region.

=== Wine production ===
Viticulture also has a very large impact on the local economy both directly, by way of employment and servicing required, and also by way of 'wine tourism'. The local cellars attracted hundreds of thousands of domestic and international tourists every year. The area also hosts the annual Marlborough Wine & Food Festival. The Marlborough wine region is now New Zealand's largest, and receives worldwide recognition for its Sauvignon Blanc wines.

With its growing international critical recognition, much of the Marlborough wine industry has come to be dominated by large firms, owned by major New Zealand companies or offshore investors. There are over 50 vineyards near Blenheim. Agricultural land prices in the Wairau Valley increased dramatically in the 1990s and 2000s.

== Lifestyle ==
The sunny, pleasant climate has long attracted people to the region, as holiday-makers or as permanent settlers. The region is especially popular among retired people, as well as people seeking an alternative lifestyle. Rapid population growth and other factors though have led to a contemporary chronic shortage of affordable housing for low and middle income earners.

The Marlborough Region has a wide range of predominantly outdoor leisure activities and the relaxed lifestyle and the flourishing wine and gourmet food industry in Marlborough are enjoyed by both locals and visitors alike.

== Events and points of interest ==
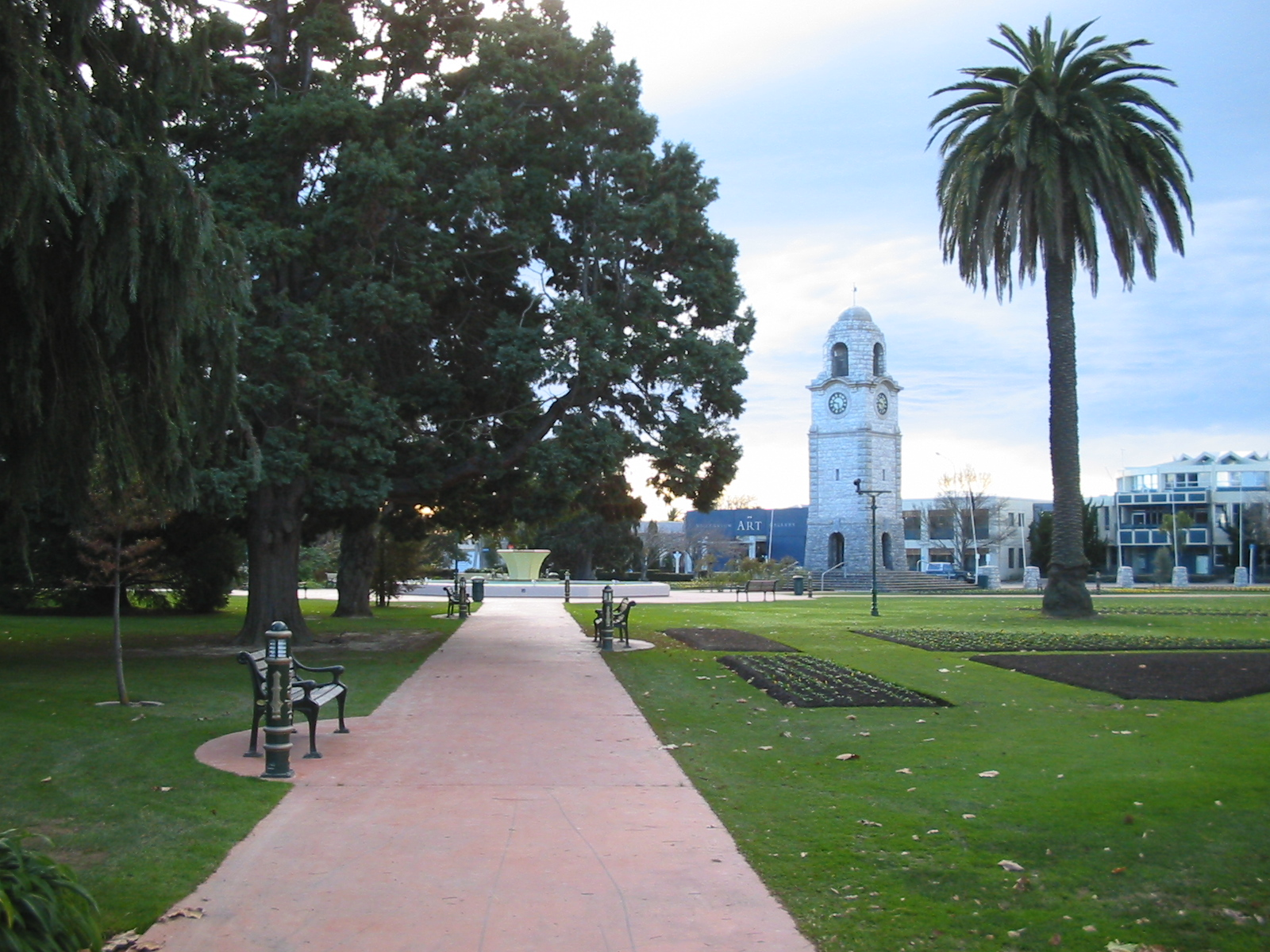
Seymour Square, the main square of Blenheim

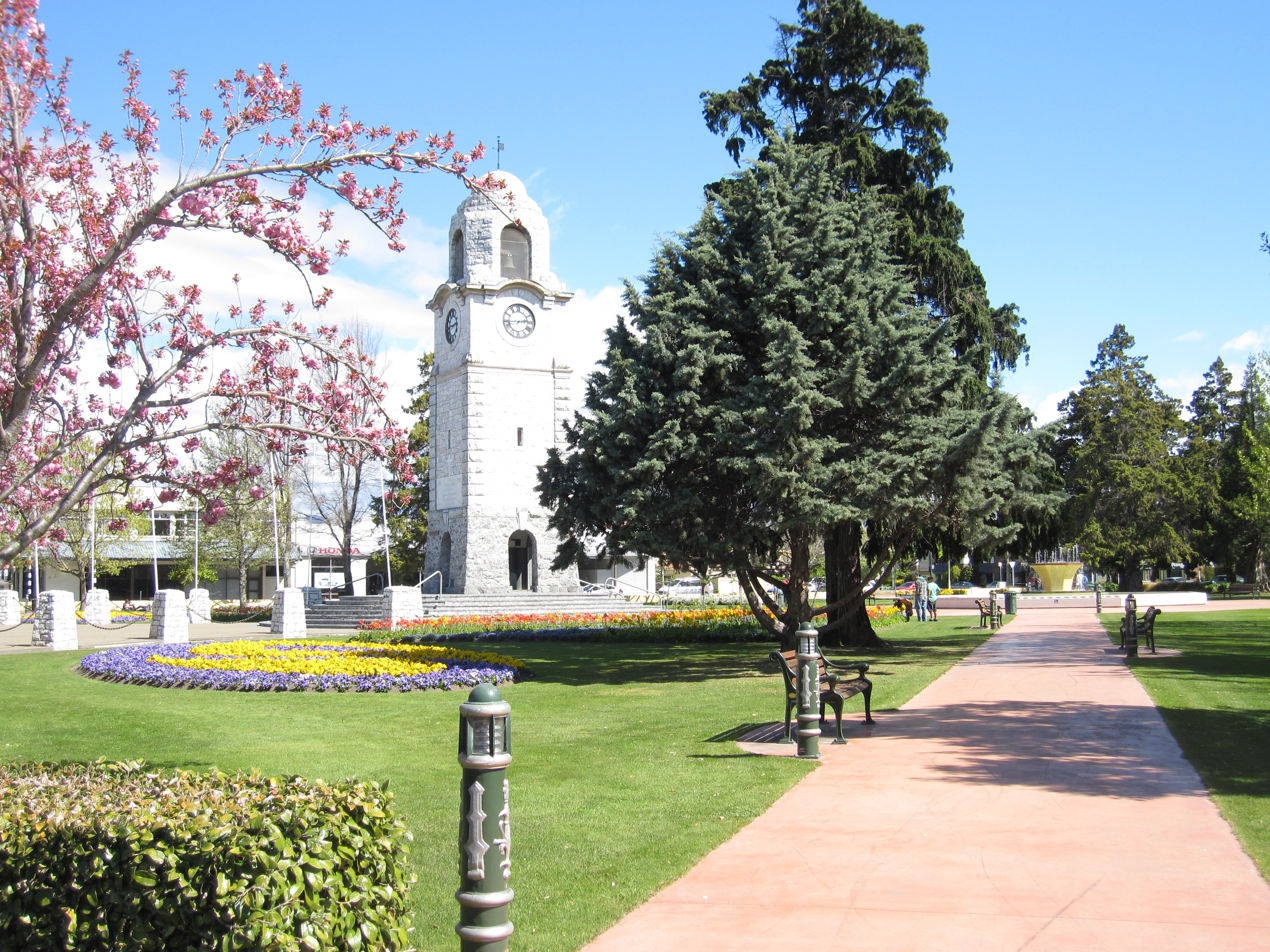
Seymour Sq, Blenheim in early spring 2012

Omaka Aerodrome, south of the town centre, is the setting for the two-yearly Classic Fighters Marlborough airshow. With a large emphasis on aircraft of World War One, it has been held since 2001.

The Cleghorn Rotunda a Heritage New Zealand category 2 historic place stands in Market Square. Built between 1889 and 1903 it was named after Dr George Cleghorn (1850-1902) a notable Blenheim doctor and surgeon. Used for many civic ceremonies it was refurbished to its original design in 2003 and 2015.

Seymour Square and Pollard Park are two of the town centres main attractions for walks and general tourism. Seymour Square is an open public area in the centre, containing the War Memorial and Clock Tower, unveiled in 1928, classified as a "Category I" ("places of 'special or outstanding historical or cultural heritage significance or value'") historic place by Heritage New Zealand. The Square was named after Henry Seymour. Pollard Park is a large public park including children's play areas, native shrubbery, rose gardens, a landscaped waterway, and is home to the Blenheim Golf Club and its 9-hole course, the Marlborough Tennis club and its courts, and Blenheim Croquet Club. They are dry and arid ranges which have previously been the site of severe grass fires.

The GCSB Waihopai communications monitoring facility, part of the ECHELON network, is near Blenheim.

== Transport ==
=== Air ===
Woodbourne Airport is a domestic airport and an RNZAF operational base. There are direct flights from Auckland and Wellington with Air New Zealand and from Wellington, Christchurch, and Paraparaumu with Sounds Air.

Omaka Aerodrome, to the south of the town centre, is used solely by private and vintage aircraft. The Classic Fighters airshow (based mainly on World War I and II aircraft) is held biennially at Easter.

=== Road ===
State Highway 1 runs through Blenheim and State Highway 6 terminates at the junction of the two state highways. Blenheim is notable for a town of its size in that it does not have traffic lights at any intersection. Instead, roundabouts speed arterial traffic flow. Since the installation of roundabouts traffic volumes have quickly increased and upgrading options are being considered, e.g. traffic lights, longer two-lane approaches and even a bypass.

=== Rail ===
Blenheim is on the Main North Line, the northern part of the unofficially-named South Island Main Trunk Railway. The Coastal Pacific, a long-distance passenger train between Picton and Christchurch, stops at Blenheim railway station. The 1906 station has been listed NZHPT Category II since 1982. It is a standard Vintage station, with Tudor half-timbering and tile.

A major rail freight facility is north of Blenheim at Spring Creek.

The narrow-gauge Blenheim Riverside Railway runs through the town.

== Infrastructure and services ==
=== Electricity ===
The Marlborough Electric Power Board (MEPB) was formed in October 1923 and established the Blenheim's first public supply in April 1927, following the commissioning of the Waihopai hydroelectric power station 40 km southwest of Blenheim. Two diesel generators were commissioned at Springlands in 1930 and 1937 to supplement the supply from Waihopai. The town was connected to Cobb Power Station in 1945, which in turn was connected to the rest of the South Island grid in 1956. The diesel generators were relegated to standby duty, last generated power on 22 July 1992, and were decommissioned in 2003. The Energy Companies Act 1992 saw the MEPB corporatised and renamed Marlborough Electric. The 1998 electricity sector reforms required electricity companies to separate their lines and supply businesses. Marlborough Electric sold its generation and retailing business to Trustpower, with the remaining lines business renamed Marlborough Lines.

Today, Marlborough Lines owns and operates the electricity distribution network servicing the town, with electricity fed from Transpower's national grid at its Blenheim substation in Springlands.

=== Water supply and sanitation ===
Blenheim's water supply is drawn from the Wairau aquifer via nine bores and is treated at two plants in Middle Renwick Road and Bomford Street.

== Education ==
The first school opened in 1859. By 1875 there were three classes: Blenheim Upper Boys', Blenheim Lower Boys', and Blenheim Girls' and Infants'. Blenheim High School was formed within the school in 1879.

Catholic schools for boys and girls were established in 1872, replaced by St Mary's Boys' School in 1886. In 1929 St Mary's was rebuilt after a fire.

Marlborough High School, a coeducational secondary school, was founded in Blenheim in 1900. In 1919 it changed its name to Marlborough College. The intermediate section was split to form Bohally Intermediate in 1956. The college was split into separate boys' and girls' schools in 1963, with Marlborough Boys' College (MBC) retaining the existing site and Marlborough Girls' College (MGC) moving to a new site. An intention to relocate both Marlborough Boys' College and Marlborough Girls' College on the site currently occupied by MGC and Bohally Intermediate was announced in 2019, with Bohally Intermediate relocating to the current MBC site on Stephenson Street. The relocation plan was scrapped in 2024.

There are currently 11 schools in the Blenheim urban area:

- Blenheim School is a state contributing primary (Year 1–6) primary school. It has a roll of approximately 144.
- Bohally Intermediate is a state intermediate (Year 7–8) school opened in 1957 following a split from Marlborough College. It has a roll of approximately 532.
- Marlborough Boys' College is a state boys' secondary (Year 9–13) school. It opened in 1963 following the split of Marlborough College into separate boys' and girls schools, and has a roll of approximately 1,024.
- Marlborough Girls' College is a state girls' secondary (Year 9–13) school. It opened in 1963 following the split of Marlborough College into separate boys' and girls school, and has a roll of approximately 960.
- Mayfield School is a state contributing primary (Year 1–6) school in Mayfield. It has a roll of approximately 97.
- Redwoodtown School is a state full primary (Year 1–8) school in Redwoodtown. It has a roll of approximately 308.
- Richmond View School is a state-integrated Christian composite (Year 1–13) school in Redwoodtown. It has a roll of approximately 330.
- Springlands School is a state contributing primary (Year 1–6) school in Springlands. It has a roll of approximately 350.
- St Mary's School is a state-integrated Catholic full primary (Years 1–8) school. It has a roll of approximately 171.
- Whitney Street School is a state contributing primary (Year 1–6) primary school. It has a roll of approximately 369.
- Witherlea School is a state contributing primary (Year 1–6) primary school in Witherlea. It has a roll of approximately 388.

Other primary schools are in the surrounding localities of Renwick, Fairhall, Grovetown, Rapaura and Riverlands.

The Nelson Marlborough Institute of Technology has a campus in Blenheim.

== Media ==
=== Print ===
Blenheim is served by a variety of print publications. The major daily newspaper serving the area is The Marlborough Express published by Fairfax NZ, with its headquarters in Blenheim. The Saturday Express and Midweek are community newspapers published by the same company and distributed throughout Marlborough. The Blenheim Sun is a twice-weekly free newspaper distributed each Wednesday and Friday while the locally owned Marlborough Weekly is published every Tuesday and delivered to every home in the region.

=== Radio ===
Blenheim is served by 22 FM radio stations. The town can also receive AM and FM radio stations from Wellington, due to the straight line-of-sight across Cook Strait and the high power of the transmitters.

== Notable people ==
- Bob Bell, politician
- Rosina Buckman, opera singer
- Charles Burns, doctor
- Frank Devine, editor and journalist
- Jim Eyles, archeologist
- William Girling, member of Parliament
- Greg Hegglun, cricketer
- Cameron Howieson, footballer
- Jamie Joseph, rugby union player
- Elizabeth Lissaman, potter
- Leon MacDonald, rugby union player
- Jack Macdonald, rower
- Ben May, rugby union player
- Liam Messam, rugby union player
- John Newton, poet
- Ben O'Keeffe, rugby union referee
- Humphrey O'Leary, Chief Justice of New Zealand
- Sam Prattley, rugby union player
- Vernon Redwood, member of the Queensland Legislative Assembly
- Callum Saunders, cyclist
- Charles Saunders, rower
- Ben Sigmund, footballer
- Robin Slow, artist
- Alan Sutherland, rugby union player
- David Teece, organizational economist and professor
- Ian Wedde, author
- Richard Wild, Chief Justice of New Zealand
- Stewart Murray Wilson, sex offender
- Michael Wintringham, State Services Commissioner
