= Marlborough District Council =

Unitary authority of New Zealand

Coordinates: 41.4012788°S 173.8406867°E

Marlborough District Council Te Tauihu-o-te-waka

History
- Founded: 1 November 1989

Leadership
- Mayor: Nadine Taylor

Structure
- Seats: 14 (1 mayor, 13 ward seats)
- Committees: 5 committees, 13 sub-committees, 1 joint committee
- Length of term: 3 years

Meeting place
- Blenheim

Website
- www.marlborough.govt.nz

Marlborough District Council (Māori: Te Tauihu-o-te-waka) is the territorial authority for the Marlborough District of New Zealand's South Island. It serves as the district's local and regional government as a unitary authority. It has existed since the 1989 reforms to local government.

The council is led by the mayor of Marlborough, who is currently Nadine Taylor. There are 13 councillors representing three wards.

== History ==
The council was formed on 1 November 1989, replacing Blenheim Borough Council (1869–1989), Picton Borough Council (1876–1989) and Marlborough County Council (1876–1989).

In 2020, the council had 275 staff, including 43 earning more than $100,000. According to the right-wing Taxpayers' Union think tank, residential rates averaged $2,602.

== Composition ==
There are seven Blenheim Ward councillors: Brian Dawson, David Croad, Jamie Arbuckle, Jenny Andrews, Mark Peters, Michael Fitzpatrick, and Thelma Sowman.

There are three Marlborough Sounds Ward councillors: deputy mayor Nadine Taylor, Barbara Faulls, and David Oddie.

There are three Wairau-Awatere Ward councillors: Cynthia Brooks, Francis Maher and Gerald Hope.

== Committees ==
The council has these committees:

- Assets and Services Committee, with sub-committees for Civil Defence Emergency Management, Parking, and Regional Transport
- Conduct Review Committee
- Environment Committee, with subcommittees for Animal Control and Resource Hearings
- Planning Finance and Community Committee, with subcommittees for Audit and Risk, the Commercial Events Fund, Grants, Housing for Seniors, Sister Cities, the Small Townships Programme, Te Ao Māori and Youth

The council also has a District Licensing Committee for alcohol issues, and a Marlborough Regional Forestry Joint Committee with Kaikoura District Council.
