= 46th New Zealand Parliament =

Term of the Parliament of New Zealand

46th Parliament of New Zealand
←	45th Parliament	47th Parliament	→
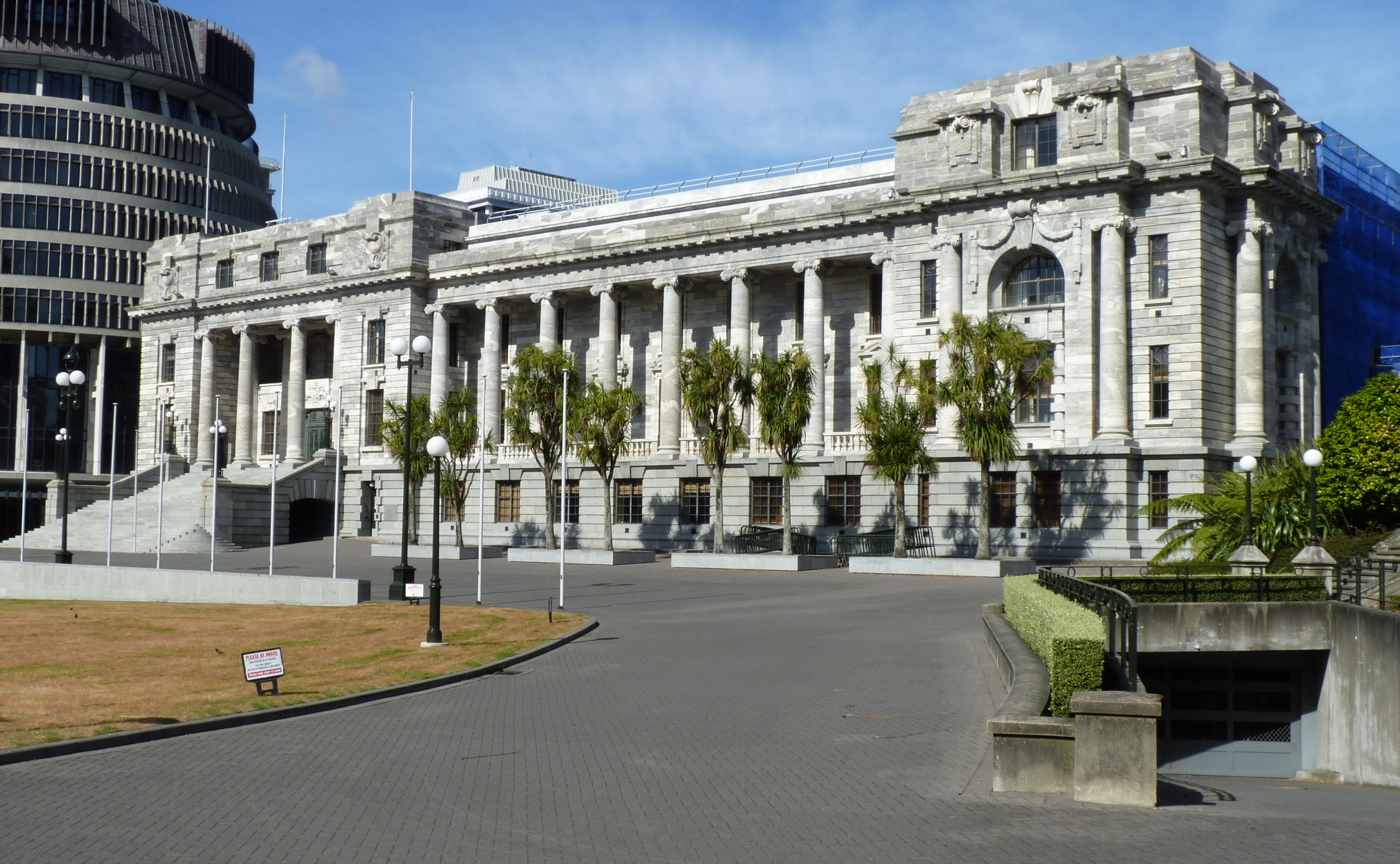
- Parliament House, Wellington

Overview
- Legislative body: New Zealand Parliament
- Term: 20 December 1999 – 11 June 2002
- Election: 1999 New Zealand general election
- Government: Fifth Labour Government

House of Representatives
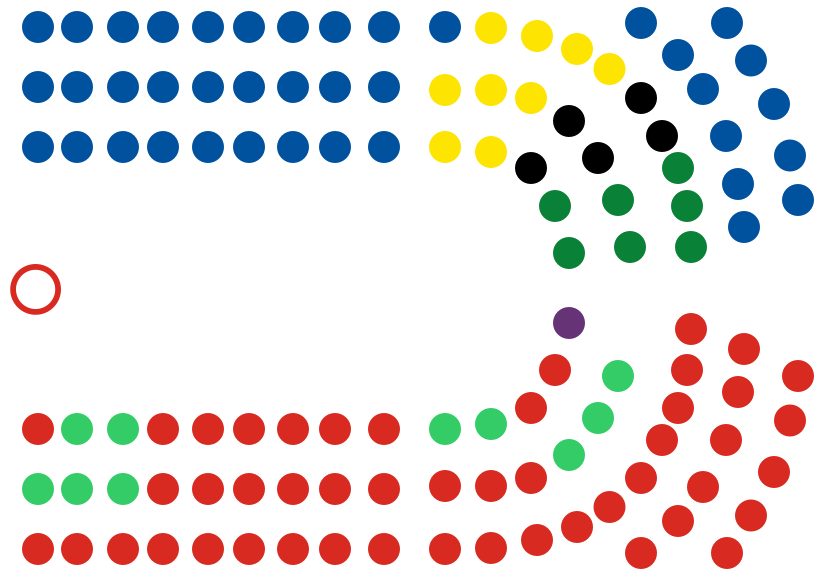
- Members: 120
- Speaker of the House: Jonathan Hunt
- Leader of the House: Michael Cullen
- Prime Minister: Helen Clark
- Leader of the Opposition: Bill English — Jenny Shipley until 8 October 2001

Sovereign
- Monarch: Elizabeth II
- Governor-General: Silvia Cartwright from 4 April 2001 — Michael Hardie Boys until 21 March 2001

The 46th New Zealand Parliament was a term of the New Zealand Parliament. Its composition was determined by the 1999 election, and it sat until the 2002 election.

The 46th Parliament marked a change of government, with a coalition of the Labour Party and the Alliance taking office. Helen Clark replaced Jenny Shipley as Prime Minister. The National Party, which had formed a minority government for the last part of the 45th Parliament, became the largest opposition party, eventually emerging under a new leader, Bill English. Other parties in Parliament were ACT, the Greens, New Zealand First, and United. Several parties represented at the end of the previous Parliament, such as Mauri Pacific, were wiped out, failing to retain any of their seats.

The 46th Parliament consisted of one hundred and twenty representatives. Sixty-seven of these representatives were chosen by geographical electorates, including six Māori electorates. The remainder were elected by means of party-list proportional representation under the Mixed Member Proportional (MMP) electoral system.

== Electoral boundaries for the 46th Parliament ==
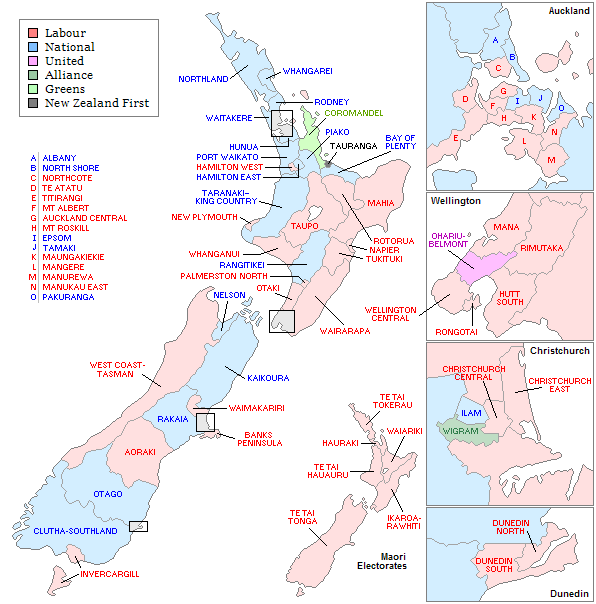

== Overview of seats ==
The table below shows the number of MPs in each party following the 1999 election and at dissolution:

Affiliation	Members	
Affiliation	At 1999 election	At dissolution
Labour	49	49
Progressive	did not exist	6
Alliance	10	4
Green ^{CS}	7	7
Government total	66	66
National	39	39
ACT	9	9
NZ First	5	5
United NZ	1	1
Opposition total	54	54
Total	120	120
Working Government majority ^{[1]}	12	12

Notes

- ^CS The Green Party entered into a confidence and supply agreement with the Labour-Alliance coalition.
- ^{1} The Working Government majority is calculated as all Government MPs less all other parties.

== Initial composition of the 46th Parliament ==
46th New Zealand Parliament - MPs elected to Parliament

List MPs are ordered by allocation as determined by the Chief Electoral Office and the party lists.

Party	Name	Electorate	Term
National	Murray McCully	Albany	Fifth
Labour	Jim Sutton	Aoraki	Fifth
Labour	Judith Tizard	Auckland Central	Fourth
Labour	Ruth Dyson	Banks Peninsula	Third
National	Tony Ryall	Bay of Plenty	Fourth
Labour	Tim Barnett	Christchurch Central	Second
Labour	Lianne Dalziel	Christchurch East	Fourth
National	Bill English	Clutha-Southland	Fourth
Green	Jeanette Fitzsimons	Coromandel	Second
Labour	Pete Hodgson	Dunedin North	Fourth
Labour	David Benson-Pope	Dunedin South	First
Labour	Janet Mackey	East Coast	Third
National	Richard Worth	Epsom	First
National	Tony Steel	Hamilton East	Third
Labour	Martin Gallagher	Hamilton West	Second
National	Warren Kyd	Hunua	Fifth
Labour	Trevor Mallard	Hutt South	Fifth
National	Gerry Brownlee	Ilam	Second
Labour	Mark Peck	Invercargill	Third
National	Lynda Scott	Kaikōura	First
National	Lindsay Tisch	Karapiro	First
Labour	Graham Kelly	Mana	Fifth
Labour	Taito Phillip Field	Mangere	Third
Labour	Ross Robertson	Manukau East	Fifth
Labour	George Hawkins	Manurewa	Fourth
Labour	Mark Gosche	Maungakiekie	Second
Labour	Helen Clark	Mount Albert	Seventh
Labour	Phil Goff	Mount Roskill	Sixth
Labour	Geoff Braybrooke	Napier	Seventh
National	Nick Smith	Nelson	Fourth
Labour	Harry Duynhoven	New Plymouth	Fourth
National	Wayne Mapp	North Shore	Second
Labour	Ann Hartley	Northcote	First
National	John Carter	Northland	Fifth
United NZ	Peter Dunne	Ohariu-Belmont	Sixth
National	Gavan Herlihy	Otago	Second
Labour	Judy Keall	Otaki	Fifth
National	Maurice Williamson	Pakuranga	Fifth
Labour	Steve Maharey	Palmerston North	Fourth
National	Paul Hutchison	Port Waikato	First
National	Jenny Shipley	Rakaia	Fifth
National	Simon Power	Rangitikei	First
Labour	Paul Swain	Rimutaka	Fourth
National	Lockwood Smith	Rodney	Sixth
Labour	Annette King	Rongotai	Fifth
Labour	Steve Chadwick	Rotorua	First
National	Clem Simich	Tamaki	Fourth
National	Shane Ardern	Taranaki-King Country	Second
Labour	Mark Burton	Taupo	Third
NZ First	Winston Peters	Tauranga	Seventh
Labour	Chris Carter	Te Atatu	Second
Labour	David Cunliffe	Titirangi	First
Labour	Rick Barker	Tukituki	Third
Labour	Clayton Cosgrove	Waimakariri	First
Labour	Georgina Beyer	Wairarapa	First
National	Brian Neeson	Waitakere	Fourth
Labour	Marian Hobbs	Wellington Central	Second
Labour	Damien O'Connor	West Coast-Tasman	Third
Labour	Jill Pettis	Whanganui	Third
National	Phil Heatley	Whangarei	First
Alliance	Jim Anderton	Wigram	Sixth
Labour	John Tamihere	Hauraki Maori	First
Labour	Parekura Horomia	Ikaroa-Rāwhiti	First
Labour	Nanaia Mahuta	Te Tai Hauāuru	Second
Labour	Dover Samuels	Te Tai Tokerau	Second
Labour	Mahara Okeroa	Te Tai Tonga	First
Labour	Mita Ririnui	Waiariki	First
ACT	Richard Prebble	Party list, rank 01	Eighth
Alliance	Sandra Lee	Party list, rank 02	Third
ACT	Ken Shirley	Party list, rank 02	Fourth
Green	Rod Donald	Party list, rank 02	Second
Alliance	Matt Robson	Party list, rank 03	Second
NZ First	Peter Brown	Party list, rank 02	Second
ACT	Stephen Franks	Party list, rank 03	First
Alliance	John Wright	Party list, rank 04	Second
Green	Ian Ewen-Street	Party list, rank 03	First
ACT	Donna Awatere Huata	Party list, rank 04	Second
Alliance	Phillida Bunkle	Party list, rank 05	Second
NZ First	Brian Donnelly	Party list, rank 03	Second
ACT	Rodney Hide	Party list, rank 05	Second
Green	Sue Bradford	Party list, rank 04	First
Alliance	Laila Harré	Party list, rank 06	Second
National	Wyatt Creech	Party list, rank 02	Fifth
National	Don McKinnon	Party list, rank 03	Eighth
ACT	Owen Jennings	Party list, rank 06	Second
National	Georgina te Heuheu	Party list, rank 06	Second
NZ First	Ron Mark	Party list, rank 04	Second
National	Roger Sowry	Party list, rank 07	Fourth
Alliance	Grant Gillon	Party list, rank 07	Second
National	Belinda Vernon	Party list, rank 10	Second
Green	Nándor Tánczos	Party list, rank 05	First
National	Pansy Wong	Party list, rank 11	Second
ACT	Muriel Newman	Party list, rank 07	Second
National	Simon Upton	Party list, rank 12	Seventh
National	John Luxton	Party list, rank 14	Fifth
Alliance	Liz Gordon	Party list, rank 08	Second
National	Max Bradford	Party list, rank 15	Fourth
National	Doug Kidd	Party list, rank 17	Eighth
NZ First	Doug Woolerton	Party list, rank 05	Second
ACT	Penny Webster	Party list, rank 08	First
National	Annabel Young	Party list, rank 18	Second
Green	Sue Kedgley	Party list, rank 06	First
Labour	Michael Cullen	Party list, rank 02	Seventh
Labour	Jonathan Hunt	Party list, rank 06	Twelfth
Alliance	Willie Jackson	Party list, rank 09	First
National	Eric Roy	Party list, rank 19	Third
Labour	Margaret Wilson	Party list, rank 09	First
National	Anne Tolley	Party list, rank 20	First
Labour	Tariana Turia	Party list, rank 16	Second
National	David Carter	Party list, rank 21	Third
Labour	Dianne Yates	Party list, rank 22	Third
National	Bob Simcock	Party list, rank 22	Second
Labour	Helen Duncan	Party list, rank 30	Second
ACT	Gerry Eckhoff	Party list, rank 09	First
Labour	Joe Hawke	Party list, rank 32	Second
Alliance	Kevin Campbell	Party list, rank 10	First
National	Katherine Rich	Party list, rank 23	First
Labour	Winnie Laban	Party list, rank 33	First
Green	Keith Locke	Party list, rank 07	First
National	Marie Hasler	Party list, rank 24	Third

== Changes during term ==
There were no by-elections held during the term of the 46th Parliament.

- Don McKinnon, a National Party list MP, left Parliament in March 2000 to become Secretary-General of the Commonwealth. He was replaced by Arthur Anae, the next candidate on the National Party list.
- Simon Upton, a National Party list MP, left Parliament in January 2001. He was replaced by Alec Neill, the next candidate on the National Party list.

== Seating plan ==
=== Start of term ===
The chamber is in a horseshoe-shape.

													Wong	Anae	Ardern	Rich	Scott
Roy	Kidd	Mapp	Herlihy	Young	Neeson	Simich	Hasler	Kyd	Steel	Newman	Franks	Webster	Eckhoff	Woolerton		Heatley	Tisch
te Heuheu	Vernon	Brownlee	J. Carter	Upton	McCully	Williamson	Simcock	D. Carter	Awatere Huata	Hide	Jennings	Brown	Mark		Donnelly	Hutchison	Tolley
M. Bradford	Luxton	Creech	Shipley	English	Sowry	N. Smith	L. Smith	Ryall	Prebble	Shirley	Peters	Donald		S. Bradford	Kedgley	Power	Worth
													Fitzsimons	Ewen-Street	Tánczos
Hunt															Locke
Hunt															Jackson
													Dunne	Peck	Campbell
Sutton	Lee	Anderton	CLARK	Cullen	Maharey	Goff	King	Mallard	Bunkle	Wright	Kelly	Keall		O'Connor	Gordon	Cunliffe	Tamihere
Harré	Robson	Gillon	Barker	Hodgson	Wilson	Samuels	Dalziel	Hawkins	Horomia	Robertson	Duynhoven	Field	Mackey		Beyer	Cosgrove	Ririnui
Braybrooke	Hobbs	Swain	C. Carter	Burton	Gosche	Tizard	Dyson	Turia	Pettis	Yates	Mahuta	Hawke	Barnett	Duncan		Chadwick	Okeroa
													Gallagher	Benson-Pope	Hartley	Laban

=== End of term ===
													Kyd	Neeson	Simich	Hutchison	Rich
Roy	Luxton	Neill	Young	Creech	Shipley	Wong	M. Bradford	Williamson	Kidd	Newman	Franks	Webster	Eckhoff	Woolerton		Anae	Tisch
Hasler	Vernon	Steel	J. Carter	McCully	Herlihy	Simcock	Scott	Power	Awatere Huata	Hide	Jennings	Brown	Mark		Donnelly	Ardern	Tolley
Mapp	te Heuheu	Sowry	English	N. Smith	Brownlee	Ryall	L. Smith	D. Carter	Prebble	Shirley	Peters	Donald		S. Bradford	Kedgley	Heatley	Worth
													Fitzsimons	Ewen-Street	Tánczos
Hunt															Locke
Hunt															Jackson
													Dunne	Peck	Campbell
Sutton	Lee	Anderton	CLARK	Cullen	Maharey	Goff	King	Mallard	Wright	Bunkle	Kelly	Keall		O'Connor	Gordon	Cunliffe	Tamihere
Harré	Robson	Gillon	Barker	Hodgson	Wilson	Horomia	Dalziel	Hawkins	Samuels	Robertson	Duynhoven	Field	Mackey		Beyer	Cosgrove	Ririnui
Braybrooke	Hobbs	Swain	C. Carter	Burton	Gosche	Tizard	Dyson	Turia	Pettis	Yates	Mahuta	Hawke	Barnett	Duncan		Chadwick	Okeroa
													Gallagher	Benson-Pope	Hartley	Laban
