= Alec Neill =

New Zealand politician (born 1950)

- Born: Alexander George Neill; 22 July 1950 (age 76); Dunedin, New Zealand
- Occupations: Lawyer and politician

Alexander George Neill (born 22 July 1950 in Dunedin, New Zealand) is a former New Zealand politician. He was a member of parliament for the National Party on three non-consecutive occasions between 1990 and 2002 and was later a member of the Canterbury Regional Council from 2003 until 2010.

== Early life and career ==
Neill was born in Dunedin, the youngest son of Alf Neill QC, then a prominent barrister practising in Dunedin. Alec Neill was raised at Allans Beach on the Otago Peninsula, attended the Hoopers Inlet Primary School and then attended St Kevin's College, Oamaru, and the University of Otago where he graduated with an LLB.

He commenced his law career with Ross Dowling Marquet and Griffen in Dunedin before shifting to Oamaru in 1974, joining solicitors George Berry and Evan Alty in the firm of Hjorring Tait and Farrell. Neill became a partner on 1 May 1976 (then aged 25) and the firm was rebranded as Berry Alty and Neill. He remained a partner of the firm until elected to Parliament in 1990. After losing the 1996 election he relocated to Christchurch in 1997 and returned to legal practice.

Neill is married to Diane and they have a blended family of five children.

== Member of Parliament ==
New Zealand Parliament
| Years | Term | Electorate | List | Party |
|---|---|---|---|---|
| 1990–1993 | 43rd | Waitaki | | National |
| 1993–1996 | 44th | Waitaki | | National |
| 1999 | 45th | List | 31 | National |
| 2001–2002 | 46th | List | 26 | National |

Jim Sutton of the Labour Party had won the Waitaki electorate in 1984 and 1987, though only by 89 votes on the second occasion. Neill was selected as the new National candidate for the 1990 election. He defeated Sutton, who was by that time the Minister of Agriculture, by 2,095 votes and was one of 27 National candidates who defeated Labour incumbents. He was narrowly re-elected by 53 votes in the 1993 election.

Neill was never appointed to a ministerial position in the Fourth National Government, but he was the chairman of the planning and development committee, which oversaw the passing of the Resource Management Act 1991, and of the justice and law reform committee.

The 1996 election was the first conducted under the mixed-member proportional representation system. The existing 99 electorates under the previous first-past-the-post voting system were reduced to 60 and Neill's Waitaki electorate was one of those disestablished. He sought National's selection for the enlarged Otago electorate but lost to newcomer Gavan Herlihy. Neill opted not to seek the nomination in the new Timaru electorate, which also took in area from Waitaki. Neill stood as a list-only candidate in 1996 and 1999 but the party did not secure enough votes for his election on either occasion.

Despite this, Neill entered Parliament twice as a list MP to succeed retiring incumbents. In January 1999, Paul East resigned from Parliament to take up a diplomatic post, and Neill became a list MP until the election that November, where he was again unsuccessful in being re-elected. In January 2001, Simon Upton resigned; Neill was again the next candidate on the National Party list, allowing him to return to Parliament. He was junior whip under National leader Jenny Shipley until October 2001 and National's spokesperson for local government and conservation under Bill English until the 2002 election.

In the 2002 election, Neill was ranked 22 on the National Party list and also contested Wigram, where he placed third behind the Progressive leader Jim Anderton and Labour candidate Mike Mora. National polled very poorly and Neill was not returned to Parliament. He did not stand in the 2005 election.

== Member of Canterbury Regional Council ==
Neill served seven years on Canterbury Regional Council (Environment Canterbury) as a councillor in the Christchurch West constituency, including seven months as chair.

Neill and future National MP Nicky Wagner were elected to fill the Christchurch West constituency positions of the retired councillor Neil Cherry and the deceased councillor Peter Yeoman. Neill was re-elected in the 2004 and 2007 local elections. Neill was the leader of the right-leaning Independent Citizens grouping and, after the 2007 elections, sought the chairmanship of the council but lost to Sir Kerry Burke by one vote.

The 2007–2010 term saw the councillors being removed by the National Government. Before urgent legislation was passed on 30 March 2010 to enable the Government-appointed commissioners to provide the region's governance, concerns about poor regional relationships and water management had surfaced, including through a Government-commissioned review led by former deputy prime minister Wyatt Creech. Neill had been elected chair of the council in September 2009, when Burke lost a confidence motion, and remained on the council until it was discharged on 1 May 2010.

== Post-political career ==
After leaving the council, Neill returned to legal practice and said he did not intend to again stand for public office. He has worked as a resource management commissioner and served on the board of the Rata Foundation (formerly the Canterbury Community Trust) from 2009 to 2013. He was a director of SBS Bank from 2012 to 2015. He is a commissioner in the Office of the Chief Freshwater Commissioner.

New Zealand Parliament
| Preceded by Jim Sutton | Member of Parliament for Waitaki; 1990–1996 | In abeyance Title next held by Jacqui Dean |
