= Jacqui Dean =

New Zealand politician

The Honourable Jacqui Dean
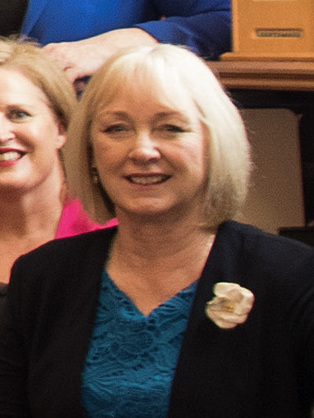
- Dean in 2018

Member of the New Zealand Parliament for Waitaki (2008–2023) Otago (2005–2008)
- In office 8 November 2005 – 14 October 2023
- Preceded by: David Parker
- Succeeded by: Miles Anderson
- Majority: 3,281

Second Assistant Speaker of the House of Representatives
- In office 26 November 2020 – 14 October 2023
- Preceded by: Adrian Rurawhe
- Succeeded by: Greg O'Connor

12th Minister of Commerce and Consumer Affairs
- In office 20 December 2016 – 26 October 2017
- Prime Minister: Bill English
- Preceded by: Paul Goldsmith
- Succeeded by: Kris Faafoi

Minister for Small Business
- In office 20 December 2016 – 26 October 2017
- Prime Minister: Bill English
- Preceded by: Craig Foss
- Succeeded by: Stuart Nash

Personal details
- Born: Jacqueline Isobel Hay; 13 May 1957 (age 69) Palmerston North, New Zealand
- Party: National Party
- Spouse: Bill Dean
- Website: http://jacquidean.co.nz

Jacqueline Isobel Dean (née Hay, born 13 May 1957) is a New Zealand politician. She was a member of parliament for the Waitaki electorate, where she represented the National Party.

== Early career ==
Dean was born in Palmerston North. She has worked in several roles, including professional acting. She hosted Play School, a children's television programme. She has also acted on stage, been a radio announcer, and worked in the education sector.

Early in Dean's political career, she served on the Waitaki District Council, representing the Oamaru ward. She also unsuccessfully contested the mayoralty.

== Member of Parliament ==
New Zealand Parliament
Years	Term	Electorate	List	Party
2005–2008	48th	Otago	40	National
2008–2011	49th	Waitaki	40	National
2011–2014	50th	Waitaki	41	National
2014–2017	51st	Waitaki	36	National
2017–2020	52nd	Waitaki	23	National
2020–2023	53rd	Waitaki	14	National

In the 2005 election, she was the National Party's successful candidate for the Otago seat, a traditional National stronghold which had unexpectedly been taken by the Labour Party's David Parker. For this election, Dean campaigned on water issues, saying in her maiden speech to parliament that she believed water to be the "single most important issue facing New Zealand today". Dean won Otago by a margin of 1,995 votes.

She was returned to Parliament in 2008 and 2011 for the geographically similar Waitaki electorate.

Dean was confirmed as Waitaki's representative in the 2014 election. During the 2014 election, Dean retained Waitaki by a margin of 16,668 votes.

During the 2017 New Zealand general election, Dean retained Waitaki by a margin of 12,816 votes.

In 2020, the Waitaki electorate returned Dean by a margin of 3,281 votes. Following the election, she was appointed an Assistant Speaker.

In late November 2021, National Party leader Judith Collins demoted fellow National MP Simon Bridges for alleged "serious misconduct" involving sexist comments that the latter had made during a party function in 2016. Dean had laid a complaint with then National Party leader and Prime Minister Bill English. Dean subsequently raised the matter in 2021 with Collins as part of the Francis review of Parliament's workplace culture. Collins' demotion of Bridges led the National Party's parliamentary caucus to remove Collins as party leader following a vote of no-confidence. Deputy Leader Shane Reti was appointed as interim leader prior to a scheduled leadership vote. In response to the fallout, Dean expressed surprise and disappointment that her actions had led to these events. She said that it was not her intention and opined that "several issues were conflated." Dean also confirmed that she had accepted Bridges' apology for his remarks.

In May 2022, Dean confirmed that she would not be contesting the 2023 New Zealand general election and would retire at the end of the 2020–2023 parliamentary term.

== Drug policy ==
Dean has been vocal on drug-related issues in New Zealand although she has no official role in this capacity.

=== 'Party pills' ===
In 2007, Dean campaigned for the banning of the sale of "party pills", namely benzylpiperazine (BZP), over which Associate Health Minister Jim Anderton (leader of the Progressive Party) accused her of indulging in political grandstanding, saying, "Perhaps Mrs Dean doesn't subscribe to the idea that any Government must balance the need to act promptly with its responsibilities to act fairly and follow due process, particularly where its actions affect those who are currently acting within existing legal constraints." Dean's press releases refer to BZP as either "cattle drench" or a "worming agent". BZP was developed for this use, but has never been commercially used as a wormer or drench. EMCDDA | News releases Evidence that Dean has used to promote the BZP ban (such as the MRINZ report on BZP) has been criticised as consisting of flawed research which does not meet peer review requirements.

=== Salvia divinorum ===
In November 2007 Dean called for the government to take action against Salvia divinorum, saying, "Salvia divinorum is a hallucinogenic drug, which has been banned in Australia, and yet here in New Zealand it continues to be sold freely" and "We’re dealing with a dangerous drug here, with the minister's wait and see approach like playing Russian Roulette with young people's lives." In March 2008 she was reportedly pleased on hearing about plans for action against salvia but saying she was not hopeful it would be fast, given that it had taken the Government two-and-a-half years to move on BZP. Her concern about salvia was that people were self-medicating with it and combining it with other drugs including alcohol. "I don’t think we understand the long-term effects of Salvia divinorum", she said.

Opponents of prohibitive Salvia restrictions argue that such reactions are largely due to an inherent prejudice and a particular cultural bias rather than any actual balance of evidence, pointing out inconsistencies in attitudes toward other more toxic and addictive drugs such as alcohol and nicotine. (Note: The worldwide number of alcohol-related deaths is calculated at over 2,000 people per day, in the US, for example, the number is over 300 deaths per day.) While not objecting to some form of regulatory legal control, in particular concerning the sale to minors or sale of enhanced high-strength extracts, most Salvia proponents otherwise argue against stricter legislation. (Note: Those advocating consideration of Salvia Divinorum's potential for beneficial use in a modern context argue that more could be learned from Mazatec culture, where Salvia is not really associated with notions of drug-taking at all and it is rather considered as a spiritual sacrament. In light of this it is argued that Salvia divinorum could be better understood more positively as an entheogen rather than pejoratively as a hallucinogen.)

=== Alcohol and tobacco ===
When questioned by Māori Party MP Tariana Turia on why she was unwilling to take the same prohibitory line on smoking cigarettes and drinking alcohol as she took on BZP, Dean said, "Alcohol and tobacco have been with our society for many, many years." Dean's Otago electorate is also home to approximately 5% of New Zealand's wine production, described by the New Zealand Wine Growers Association as a new but aggressively expanding wine area, which is now New Zealand's seventh-largest wine region.

=== Dihydrogen monoxide hoax ===
In August 2007, as a result of emails from ACT on Campus members based loosely around the well-known dihydrogen monoxide hoax, she sent a letter to Associate Health Minister Jim Anderton, asking if there were any plans to ban "dihydrogen monoxide", apparently not realising that it is the chemical name of water.

In September 2007, the Social Tonics Association of New Zealand (STANZ) called for Dean to step down from speaking on drug issues after she demonstrated "a lack of credibility in calling for the ban of dihydrogen monoxide (water)". STANZ Chairman Matt Bowden said, "The DHMO hoax played on the member this week is not a joke, it highlights a serious issue at the heart of drug policymaking. Ms Dean demonstrated a 'ban anything moderately harmful' reflex. This approach is just downright dangerous." "Jacqui Dean has clearly demonstrated a lack of credibility in her requests to the Minister to consider banning water; She has also seriously embarrassed her National Party colleagues who can no longer have confidence in her petitions to ban BZP or anything else."

When interviewed on the radio by Marcus Lush on 14 September 2007, she referred to the members of ACT on Campus as "left-wingers". She also suggested that there were no lessons to be learned from her attempts to call for a ban on water.

== Citations ==
New Zealand Parliament
Preceded by David Parker	Member of Parliament for Otago; 2005–2008	Constituency abolished
In abeyance Title last held by Alec Neill	Member of Parliament for Waitaki; 2008–2023	Succeeded by Miles Anderson
