= Brendon Burns (politician) =

New Zealand politician

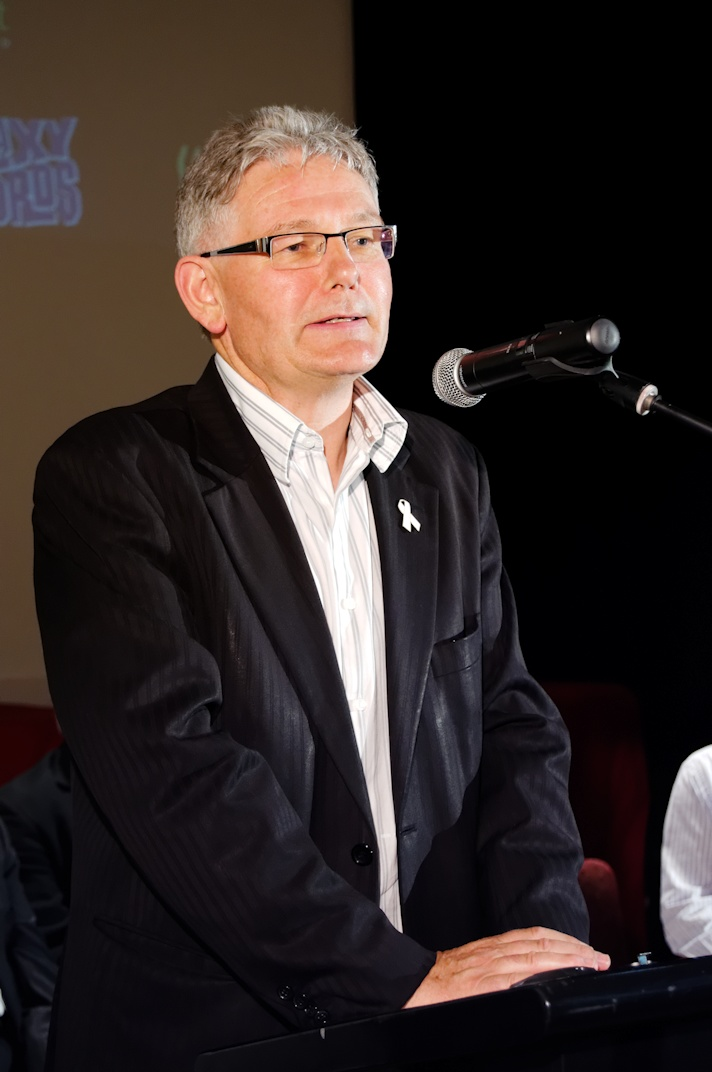
- Brendon Burns in 2010

Member of the New Zealand Parliament for Christchurch Central
- In office 2008–2011
- Preceded by: Tim Barnett
- Succeeded by: Nicky Wagner
- Majority: 935 (2.91%)

Personal details
- Party: Labour
- Children: Two
- Website: http://www.brendonburns.co.nz/ brendonburns.co.nz

Brendon Burns is a New Zealand former journalist and politician. He was elected as a Labour Party Member of Parliament in the Christchurch Central electorate from 2008 until 2011.

== Early life and journalism career ==
Burns was born in England. His ancestors had migrated there from Ireland during the Great Famine. At age four, he was brought, with his five siblings, from Liverpool to New Zealand. He was raised Catholic. With his wife Philippa, he has two children.

Burns trained as a journalist and worked in Britain and New Zealand. He was a reporter covering the Brighton hotel bombing for ITN in 1984. In New Zealand, Burns worked for 12 years in the Parliamentary Press Gallery, reporting for The Press. From 1994 to 2002, he was editor of The Marlborough Express. During that period he led various community initiatives and won the country's top journalism award: a term at Cambridge University. In 1999 he won the Qantas Award for best editorial writer.

After the 2002 election, which he unsuccessfully contested for Labour, he moved to Wellington to run a communications team in the prime minister's office until 2005. From 2005 to 2008 he ran his own communications business.

== Political career ==
New Zealand Parliament
Years	Term	Electorate	List	Party
2008–2011	49th	Christchurch Central	49	Labour

Burns stood twice in the Kaikōura seat for Labour, losing to the National Party candidates Lynda Scott and Colin King in 2002 and 2005. He was selected to replace Tim Barnett in the Christchurch Central for the 2008 general election.

Burns successfully held Christchurch Central for Labour, although Barnett's former margin was greatly reduced to 935. Burns was appointed Labour's spokesman for broadcasting until February 2011 and thereafter was spokesperson for climate change and water. He sat on the finance and expenditure committee, the primary production committee, and the local government and environment committee.

In September 2010, Burns's member's bill, the Environment Canterbury (Democracy Restoration) Amendment Bill, was drawn from the member's ballot. The bill would reverse the government's replacement of the Canterbury Regional Council with unelected commissioners and force a special election to be held. The Bill was transferred to Ruth Dyson after Burns's 2011 election loss; it was voted down in 2012.

In 2011, the election night result for Christchurch Central had a tie between Burns and National's Nicky Wagner on 10,493 votes each. After a two-week wait, Wagner was declared the winner with a 47 vote lead. Burns attributed his loss to "the after-effects of the Christchurch earthquake and the crumbling party vote for Labour." Ranked at 29 on the Labour list, Burns was too low to be elected as a list MP. In January 2012, Burns announced he would not seek another term.

== Later life ==
After his election defeat, Burns returned to Marlborough with the intention to develop a vineyard and work in communications. In 2020, he was appointed to the Marlborough Skills Leadership Group.

New Zealand Parliament
Preceded by Tim Barnett	Member of Parliament for Christchurch Central; 2008–2011	Succeeded by Nicky Wagner
