= Nicky Wagner =

New Zealand teacher, businesswoman and politician (born 1953)

The Honourable Nicky Wagner
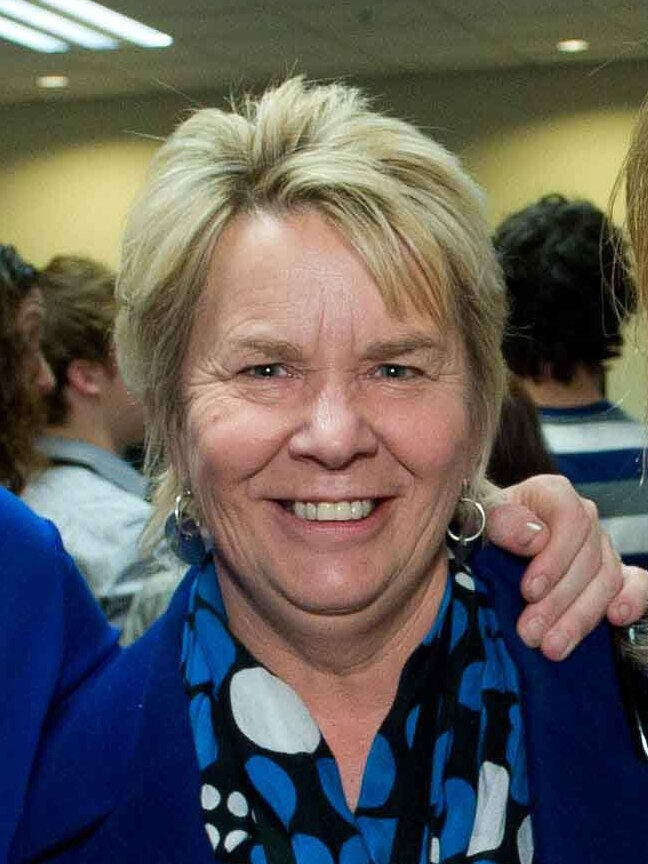
- Wagner in 2012

Member of the New Zealand House of Representatives
- In office 23 September 2017 – 17 October 2020
- Constituency: National Party List
- In office 26 November 2011 – 23 September 2017
- Preceded by: Brendon Burns
- Succeeded by: Duncan Webb
- Constituency: Christchurch Central
- In office 17 September 2005 – 26 November 2011
- Constituency: National Party List

Minister supporting Greater Christchurch Regeneration
- In office 2 May 2017 – 26 October 2017
- Prime Minister: Bill English
- Preceded by: Gerry Brownlee
- Succeeded by: Megan Woods

Personal details
- Born: 23 July 1953 (age 73) Christchurch, New Zealand
- Party: National
- Spouse: David
- Children: Two sons
- Occupation: Business
- Profession: Teacher
- Website: Nicky Wagner

Nicola Joanne Wagner (born 23 July 1953) is a former New Zealand politician. After a career in teaching and business, she was a National Party member of the New Zealand House of Representatives from 2005 to 2020, when she retired.

Wagner represented the Christchurch Central electorate from 2011 to 2017. Between 2014 and 2017, she was Minister of Customs, Minister for Disability Issues, Minister supporting Greater Christchurch Regeneration.

== Early life and career ==
Born in Christchurch, one of three children to a teacher mother and engineer father, Wagner grew up in Cashmere. Her early education was at Burnside Primary School and St Margaret's College. She received a teaching degree from Christchurch College of Education, a BA from the University of Canterbury, and an MBA from Massey University. After working for a time as a teacher, she entered the business world, and established a successful fashion marketing company and later an internet marketing business. She was an internet pioneer establishing firstly FashioNZ (a website to support the New Zealand fashion industry) and then GardenNZ.

She has two children.

== Political career ==
=== Early political campaign ===
Wagner was selected as the National Party candidate in Christchurch Central for the 2002 general election, and ranked at 37th on the party list. She lost convincingly to the incumbent, Tim Barnett, and National's overall poor result meant she was not elected as a list MP.

=== Local government ===
Environment Canterbury (ECan) councillor Peter Yeoman died in October 2002. Soon after, councillor Neil Cherry resigned shortly over health concerns. Both councillors had represented the Christchurch West constituency. The by-election to fill the vacancies was held in April 2003 and won by Wagner and former National Party Member of Parliament Alec Neill.

When Wagner received a high list ranking for the 2005 general election, there was concern whether she could do justice to both being a regional councillor and a member of parliament. Wagner was elected to Parliament in retired from ECan at the 2007 local elections.

=== Member of Parliament ===
New Zealand Parliament
Years	Term	Electorate	List	Party
2005–2008	48th	List	28	National
2008–2011	49th	List	43	National
2011–2014	50th	Christchurch Central	42	National
2014–2017	51st	Christchurch Central	25	National
2017–2020	52nd	List	22	National

Wagner was re-selected for National in Christchurch Central in the 2005 general election and given an improved list rank of 28. This was the third-highest placement for candidates who were not already members of Parliament, behind Tim Groser and Chris Finlayson. When National won 39.1% of the party vote, Wagner was elected as a list MP.

Prior to her election, Wagner had endorsed the NZ Flag.com Trust's campaign for a referendum on New Zealand's flag, stating "Our flag should celebrate our nation's identity and our special foot-print on this earth. We will always respect and cherish our links with the past that are represented in our present flag but a young country needs to create a strong vision for its future." In her maiden statement, delivered on 22 November 2005, Wagner said: "Strong countries built this country, but we, the present generation, are free-riding on the efforts of those who have gone before."

In Wagner's first term in Parliament she sat on the Justice and Electoral select committee from 2005 to 2008 and, the final two months of the term, the Local Government and Environment committee. At the 2008 election, in which she lost in her electorate to new Labour candidate Brendon Burns, Wagner reduced Labour's majority by nearly 7,000 votes but was returned for a second term as a list MP. In her second term, she was deputy chair of the Local Government and Environment committee and also sat on the Health committee and the Emissions Trading Scheme Review committee.

Wagner had a mostly conservative voting record on social issues. In 2005, she voted for the Marriage (Gender Clarification) Amendment Bill, a bill which would have amended the Marriage Act to define marriage as only between a man and a woman. In 2009, she voted against the Misuse of Drugs (Medicinal Cannabis) Amendment Bill, a bill aimed at amending the Misuse of Drugs Act so that cannabis could be used for medical purposes. However, in 2012 and 2013 she voted in support of the Marriage (Definition of Marriage) Amendment Bill, which passed and legalised same-sex marriage in New Zealand.

At the 2011 election, the contest in Christchurch Central was tied on election night. Special votes, counted later, gave Wagner a 47-vote majority. This marked the first time National had ever held the Christchurch Central electorate since its creation in 1946. In her third term, Wagner chaired the Local Government and Environment committee and sat on the Māori Affairs committee. In 2013 she was appointed Parliamentary Private Secretary to the Minister for Canterbury Earthquake Recovery, Gerry Brownlee, and to the Minister of Conservation, Nick Smith. In May 2014, Wagner became a Minister outside Cabinet, succeeding Maurice Williamson as Minister of Customs, Minister of Statistics, Associate Minister of Conservation, and Associate Minister for Canterbury Earthquake Recovery.

The boundaries of the Christchurch Central electorate were redrawn for the 2014 election. When the draft boundaries were published for consultation, Wagner declared the electorate as more Labour-focussed and "unwinnable" due to the proposed loss of more affluent suburbs. However, she stood again and won an improved majority of 2,420. During the election period Wagner defended employing Simon Lusk, a controversial political strategist mentioned in Dirty Politics, claiming New Zealand's grassroots campaigning is "very much amateurish". After the election, she was reappointed to the ministry as Minister of Customs, Minister for Disability Issues, Associate Minister for Canterbury Earthquake Recovery, and Associate Minister of Conservation. She became an associate minister in the health and tourism portfolios in December 2016. In a May 2017 reshuffle, she relinquished the customs portfolio and became Minister supporting Greater Christchurch Regeneration.

On 14 June 2017, Wagner made a comment on Twitter that she'd "rather be out on the harbour" while mentioning that she was attending disability meetings, attracting online criticism. Labour and Green politicians commented on the issue, stating "It really makes me question her commitment to the disability community if she'd rather be out on the harbour than in meetings with them."

After losing her seat in the 2017 election to Labour's Duncan Webb, she stayed on as a list MP, but decided not to stand again for the 2020 election. She was the National Party opposition spokesperson for disability issues from November 2017 to March 2018, and for arts, culture and heritage and greater Christchurch regeneration from March 2018 to February 2020.

In 2024, Wagner was appointed a member of the Nelson Marlborough conservation board.

New Zealand Parliament
Preceded by Brendon Burns	Member of Parliament for Christchurch Central; 2011–2017	Succeeded by Duncan Webb
