= Ian Ewen-Street =

New Zealand politician

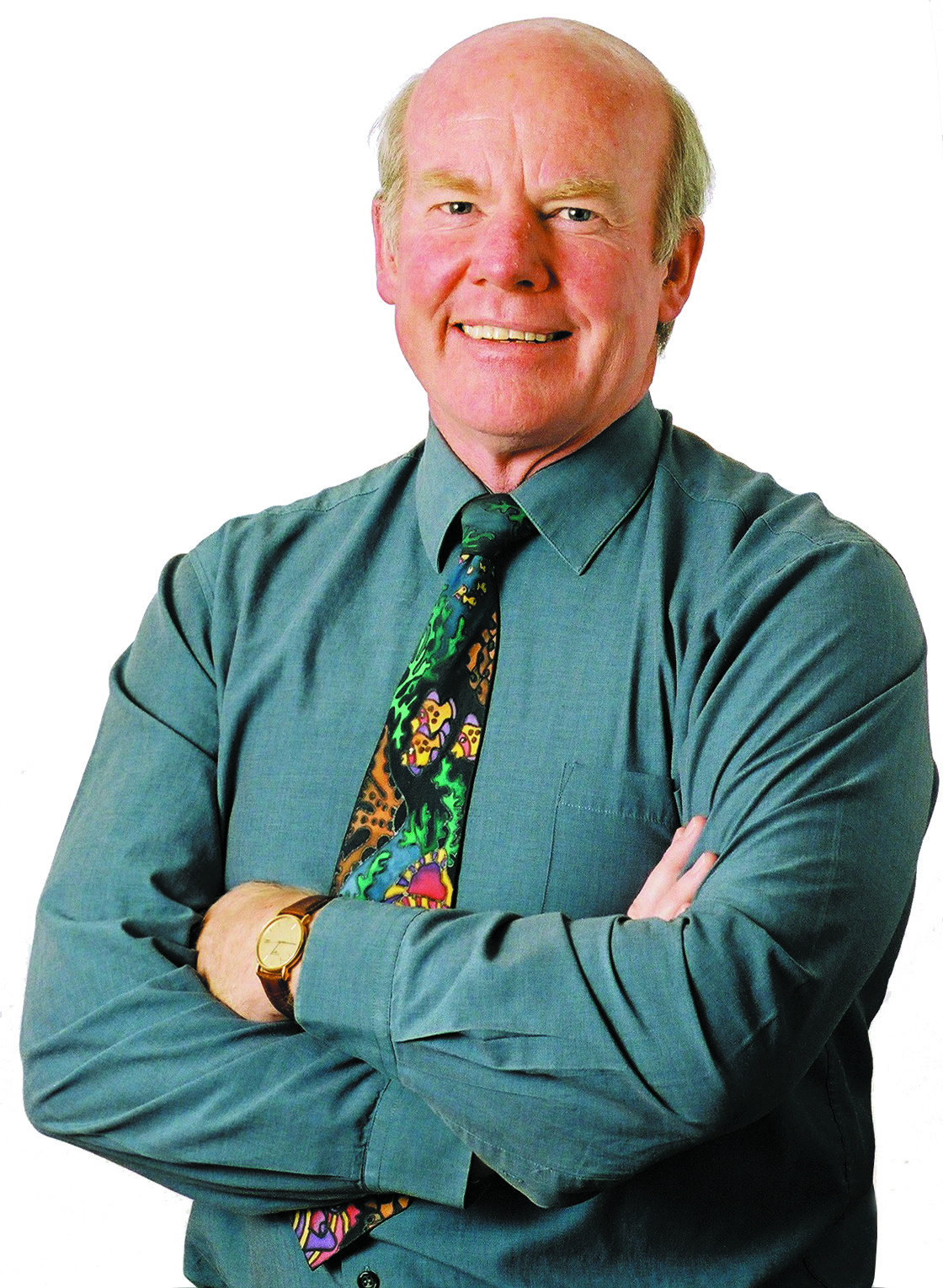

Member of the New Zealand Parliament for Green Party list
- In office 27 November 1999 – 17 September 2005

Personal details
- Born: 1949 (age 76–77)
- Party: Green Party (until 2006); National Party (2006-)

Ian Ewen-Street (born 1949) is a New Zealand politician. He was a member of the Green Party and a Member of the New Zealand Parliament for the Greens from 1999 to 2005. He has been prominent in advocacy for organic farming, organic gardening and biosecurity in New Zealand.

== Political career ==
New Zealand Parliament
Years	Term	Electorate	List	Party
1999–2002	46th	List	3	Green
2002–2005	47th	List	6	Green

In the 1996 election, when the Green Party was part of the Alliance, Ewen-Street was the Alliance candidate for the Kaikoura electorate, where he came fourth in the candidate vote. His list ranking of 52 was far too low to enter Parliament as a list MP.

He first entered Parliament as a list MP in the 1999 election, having been ranked third on the newly independent Green Party's party list. He was re-elected in the 2002 election. In June 2004, however, he announced that he would be retiring from politics at the next election, saying that the birth of his daughter meant that he wanted to spend more time at home.

In August 2006, Ewen-Street joined the National Party, saying his passion for the environment hasn't changed, but he believes more progress can be made through a major party such as National.

== Personal life ==
Ewen-Street was in a relationship with Sue Grey, a Nelson lawyer. Ewen-Street resigned the probe into scampi when he fell in love with Grey while she was appearing before his select committee on the scampi inquiry. Ewen-Street laid a police complaint when Grey was fired from the Department of Conservation, alleging judicial misconduct.

In 2003 Ewen-Street divorced Margaret O'Brien, his wife of 16 years, and had a daughter with Grey named Ysabella; Grey had two children from a previous relationship.
