= Steffan Browning =

New Zealand politician

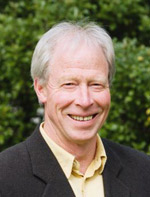

Member of the New Zealand Parliament for Green party list
- In office 30 November 2011 – 23 September 2017

Personal details
- Born: Steffan John Browning; 3 July 1954 (age 72) Clyde, New Zealand
- Party: Green

Steffan John Browning (born 3 July 1954) is a New Zealand politician of the Green Party of Aotearoa New Zealand. He was elected as a member of the House of Representatives in 2011 and retired in 2017.

== Early life ==
Browning was born in Clyde, New Zealand, in 1954. He has been employed by the Soil & Health Association as its spokesperson since 2003.

== Political career ==
New Zealand Parliament
| Years | Term | Electorate | List | Party |
|---|---|---|---|---|
| 2011–2014 | 50th | List | 10 | Green |
| 2014–2017 | 51st | List | 14 | Green |

Browning is a member of the Green Party of Aotearoa New Zealand. He was ranked 19th on their party list at the 2002 election, eleventh in 2005 and twelfth in 2008. He stood as the Greens candidate in the Kaikōura electorate.

Browning was placed in tenth place on the Green Party list for the 2011 election, when he was elected to Parliament, with the Greens gaining 14 seats. For the 2014 election, he was initially demoted to number 15, but was number 14 on the final list after twelfth-ranked Holly Walker subsequently withdrew from the list. The Greens again won 14 seats and Browning returned to parliament as their last MP from the party list. Based on preliminary election results, he would have missed out.

=== Homeopathy controversy ===
In November 2014 the Green Party stripped Browning of his natural health products portfolio, after he signed and shared an online petition supporting the use of homeopathy to treat Ebola virus disease. Party co-leader Metiria Turei described Browning's actions as "a mistake", and said that the portfolio change was designed to reassure the public that the Greens "take health issues seriously". Browning said he did not oppose homeopathy on a personal level.

=== Announcement that he would not contest the 2017 general election ===
On 15 December 2016, he announced alongside Catherine Delahunty that he will not be seeking re-election in the 2017 election.
