= Stuart Smith (politician) =

New Zealand politician

Stuart Smith MP
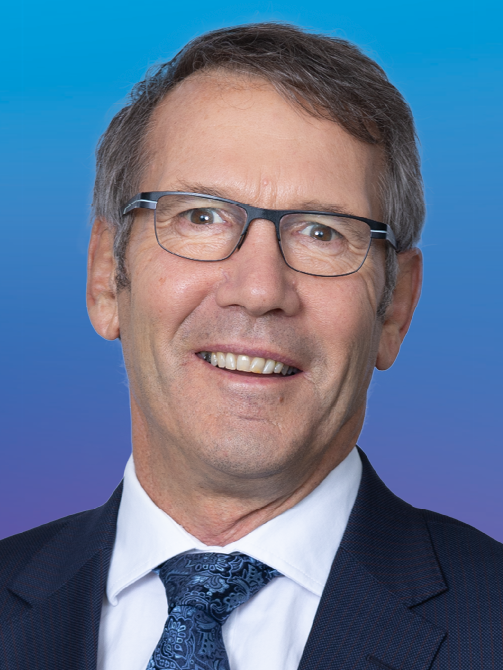
- Smith in 2023

Chief Government Whip in the New Zealand House of Representatives
- Incumbent
- Assumed office 4 March 2025
- Prime Minister: Christopher Luxon
- Preceded by: Scott Simpson

Member of the New Zealand Parliament for Kaikōura
- Incumbent
- Assumed office 20 September 2014
- Preceded by: Colin King
- Majority: 12,570

Personal details
- Born: Stuart Tayler Smith; 1963 (age 62–63)
- Party: National
- Spouse: Julie Smith
- Website: stuartsmith.co.nz

Stuart Tayler Smith (born 1963) is a New Zealand National Party politician. He was first elected as a Member of the New Zealand House of Representatives for the Kaikōura electorate, representing the National Party, in the 2014 general election. As of 2025, he is Senior Whip of the National Party and Chief Government Whip.

Before his political career, he was a Marlborough grape grower and chairman of the New Zealand Winegrowers Association.

== Early life and career ==
Smith was born on a South Canterbury farm near Methven. His father was a shearer and later owned his own farm. Smith began his career working on the family farm and purchased a half-share in his wife's family's Marlborough vineyard in 1994. Later, they began making and selling their own wine. Their winery, Fairhall Downes Estate, was sold in 2015.

Smith was on the board of the New Zealand Winegrowers Association, including for six years as chair from 2006 until 2012. Smith's time as chair coincided with a downturn in the New Zealand wine industry. Smith opposed measures proposed to support the industry, such as its consolidation into cooperative models similar to Fonterra and Zespri, stating that more formal cooperation would not improve strained relationships between grape growers and winemakers.

== Political career ==
New Zealand Parliament
| Years | Term | Electorate | List | Party |
|---|---|---|---|---|
| 2014–2017 | 51st | Kaikōura | 62 | National |
| 2017–2020 | 52nd | Kaikōura | 47 | National |
| 2020–2023 | 53rd | Kaikōura | 32 | National |
| 2023–2026 | 54th | Kaikōura | 56 | National |
| 2026–present | 55th | Kaikōura | 21 | National |

=== National candidacy and first term, 2014–2027 ===
It was reported during Smith's tenure as chair of the Winegrowers Association that he was considering running for Parliament in the Kaikōura electorate. In 2013, Smith successfully challenged incumbent MP Colin King for National's nomination to contest the electorate. During the 2014 New Zealand general election, he was elected with a majority of 12,570 votes.

During his first term, the last of the Fifth National Government, Smith was the deputy chair of the primary production committee (from 2014 to 2017) and the social services committee (in 2017).

=== In opposition, 2017–2023 ===
Smith retained the Kaikōura seat for the National Party during the 2017 and 2020 New Zealand general elections. Between 2017 to 2023, the National Party served as the official parliamentary opposition. Smith held party spokesperson roles in the civil defence, Earthquake Commission, immigration, viticulture, climate change, and energy and resources portfolios.

Two members bills promoted by Smith were debated in Parliament in 2020 and 2023. Smith's Insurance (Prompt Settlement of Claims for Uninhabitable Residential Property) Bill proposed imposing a six-month time limit for insurers to make decisions and notify claimants on claims relating to earthquake damaged buildings. The bill, first lodged in 2018, was progressed to select committee consideration in July 2020 but Smith later withdrew it after the committee found the government was already undertaking work to address the issue. In 2023, the Sale and Supply of Alcohol (Cellar Door Tasting) Amendment Bill was introduced. This bill proposed regulatory reforms related to cellar door operations at wineries and was passed at its first reading in a 105–9 vote.

=== Fourth term, 2023–2026 ===
During the 2023 New Zealand general election, Smith retained Kaikōura for a fourth term. elections. During the 54th New Zealand Parliament, Smith chaired the finance and expenditure committee from December 2023 to February 2025. In March 2025 he became Senior Whip of the National Party and Chief Government Whip.

In April 2026, it was reported by Radio New Zealand, The Spinoff and The New Zealand Herald that Smith had been "ghosted" by Prime Minister Christopher Luxon. As Senior Whip, Smith reportedly attempted to alert Luxon to "flagging caucus support" during a parliamentary sitting week, but the Prime Minister allegedly remained unreachable, forcing Smith to relay the warning to Deputy Leader Nicola Willis instead. Critics described this as a deliberate attempt to avoid a formal notification that could trigger a leadership challenge. At a press conference in Pōkeno on 17 April 2026, Luxon denied the reports, stating he had not been approached by Smith regarding his leadership and that he remained confident in his position.

=== Fifth term, 2026–present ===
During the 2026 New Zealand general election, Smith contested the Kaikōura electorate for National. He was ranked 21st on the National Party list. On 7 November, Smith retained Kaikōura by a margin of 8,018 votes over his main challenger, Labour candidate Matt Flight, based on preliminary results.

== Political views ==
Smith voted in favour of decriminalising abortion and legalising euthanasia.

== Personal life ==
Smith is married to Julie, a former occupational therapist. They have three children.

New Zealand Parliament
| Preceded by Colin King | Member of Parliament for Kaikōura; 2014–present | Incumbent |
