= Ted Howard (conservationist) =

New Zealand conservationist

Ted Howard QSM
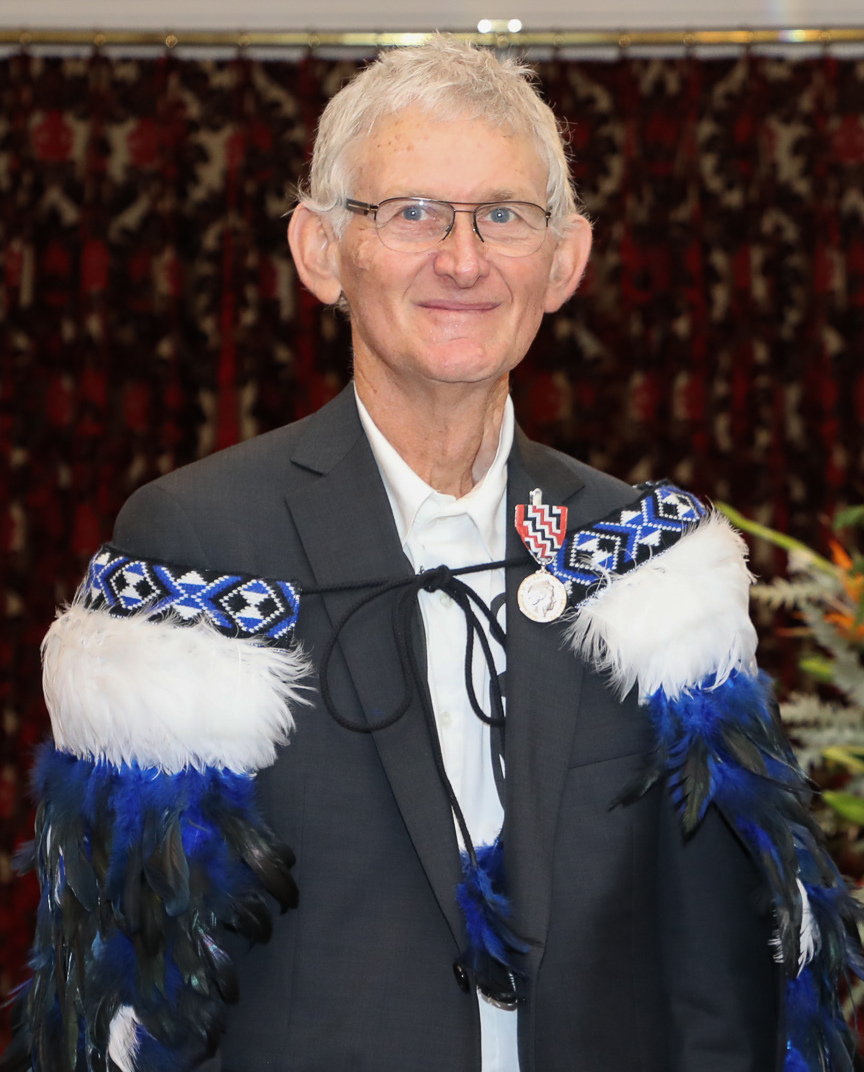
- Howard in 2022
- Born: Thomas Edward Howard
- Education: University of Auckland
- Occupation: Commercial fisherman
- Known for: Wildlife conservation
- Spouse: Ailsa McGilvary

Thomas Edward Howard QSM is a New Zealand conservationist. He is a long-term resident of Kaikōura in the South Island of New Zealand, and is known for his work with conservation of Hutton's shearwater and banded dotterel in the Kaikōura region. He is also active in marine conservation and has been appointed to a statutory role as a member of the Kaikōura Marine Guardians. Howard was awarded the Queen's Service Medal in 2022 for services to wildlife conservation.

== Career ==
Howard has a Bachelor of Science in zoology (marine ecology) from the University of Auckland, where he studied under John Morton.

Howard has more than 30 years of commercial fishing experience. He began his career in the industry in the Firth of Thames before moving to work based out of Wellington, Greymouth and Nelson. He has coastal and deep-sea maritime qualifications and has worked for the Fishing Industry Board as a technical advisor. Howard has also been president of the New Zealand Recreational Fishing Council, an organisation that lobbies for the sustainable management of fisheries in New Zealand, for the benefit of recreational fishers.

Howard has been chair of the Kaikōura water zone committee, a joint committee of Environment Canterbury and Kaikōura District Council. This committee works with Environment Canterbury staff and members of the local community on water management initiatives in the Kaikōura region. Howard has also been president of the Kaikōura Boating Club, and is an office-holder of the Lions Club of Kaikōura.

In the 2014 general election, Howard stood as a candidate for the Money Free Party in the Kaikōura electorate, finishing ninth with 72 votes. He stood again in the Kāikoura electorate at the 2020 general election, this time as an independent, receiving 93 votes to finish 11th out of 12 candidates. Howard is a former member of the Kaikōura District Council, and in 2016 he stood for election to the position of mayor, finishing fourth.

== Conservation work ==
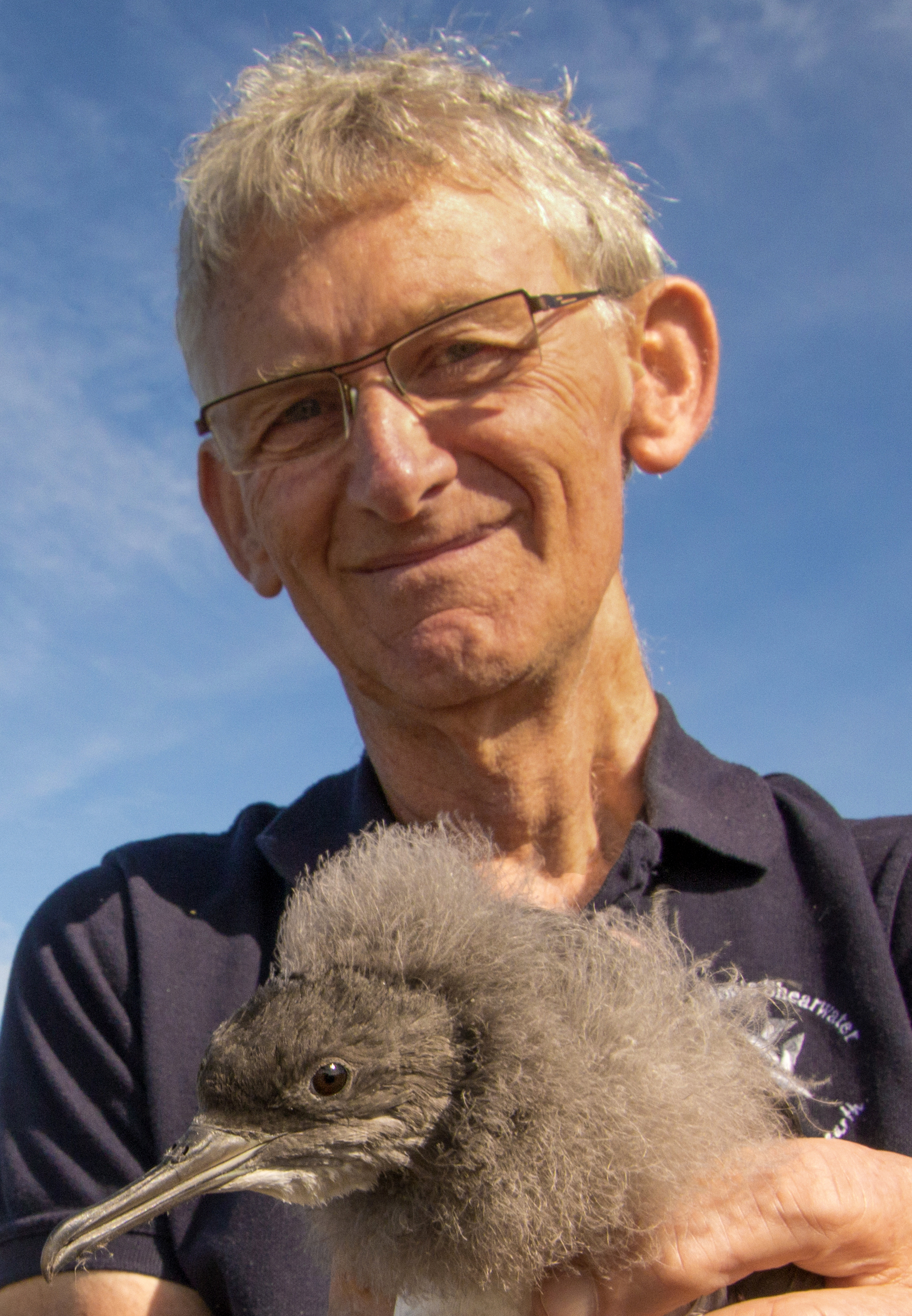
Howard holding a Hutton's shearwater chick, 2017

=== Hutton's shearwaters ===
As of 2025, Howard is one of the trustees and the chair of The Hutton's Shearwater Charitable Trust, formed in October 2008 to promote conservation of the endangered Hutton's shearwater or kaikōura tītī. The bird's range is Australian and New Zealand waters, but it breeds only on mainland New Zealand. Its conservation status is Endangered, because there are just two remaining breeding colonies, both located in the Seaward Kaikōura Range. It is the only seabird in the world that is known to breed in alpine areas.

In his role as chair of the Trust, Howard leads conservation measures for the shearwaters, including community initiatives to rescue birds that crash-land at night on streets in Kaikōura. Howard has been involved in establishing and maintaining a new protected breeding area for Hutton's shearwaters on the Kaikōura Peninsula, including a predator-proof fence, man-made burrows, and translocating fledgling birds from the remaining colonies.

In 2017, Howard drew attention to the impacts of the 2016 Kaikōura earthquake on the breeding population of shearwaters. He outlined the loss of adult birds and chicks in the alpine colonies, and the increased risk of predation as a result of landslides caused by the earthquake.

In November 2019, Howard met with the Prince of Wales during the royal visit to Kaikōura, and discussed the conservation efforts for Hutton's shearwaters.

=== Banded dotterel study ===
Howard has been closely involved in the study of banded dotterels or pohowera at Kaikōura that was initiated by Ailsa McGilvary in the 2015/16 breeding season to systematically monitor the birds' breeding success. The study has continued over multiple breeding seasons, confirming the poor breeding success, with the leading cause being cat predation of eggs, chicks and adult birds. Howard shares in much of the work of monitoring nests.

=== Kaikōura marine area management ===
Howard was one of the founders of an incorporated society, Te Korowai o Te Tai o Marokura, Kaikōura Coastal Marine Guardians (Te Korowai). The society was formed in 2005 and incorporated in 2008, to develop use and protection strategies and actions for the Kaikōura coast. Howard was part of the work of the society that led to the passing of the Kaikōura (Te Tai o Marokura) Marine Management Act in August 2014. This Act established the Kaikōura marine management area, including a new marine reserve, sanctuaries and protections for whales and fur seals, and established new fishing regulations. It also recognised taiapure (traditional Māori fishing grounds which include areas of special cultural or spiritual significance). As of 2025, Howard is Deputy Chair and community representative (conservation) member of Te Korowai.

In 2015, Howard was appointed to a statutory role under the Kaikōura (Te Tai o Marokura) Marine Management Act, as a member of the Kaikōura Marine Guardians.

== Honours and awards ==
In the 2022 New Year Honours, Howard and his wife Ailsa McGilvary were each awarded the Queen's Service Medal, for services to conservation, particularly wildlife conservation.

== Personal life ==
Howard is married to Ailsa McGilvary, and is a long-term resident of Kaikōura.

In July 2008, Howard was diagnosed with advanced melanoma, and told that there was only a two per cent chance of his surviving another two years. He credits his survival to major changes in diet and lifestyle, including reducing stress and positive thinking.
