= Colin King =

New Zealand politician

Colin McDonald King MNZM (born 19 December 1949) is a New Zealand politician who first entered Parliament in 2005. In late 2013, he lost the National Party selection process for the Kaikōura electorate for the 2014 general election.

== Early years and family ==
King was born in 1949 in Canterbury. He is a farmer from Marlborough, and has held senior roles in various boards and trusts relating to the agricultural sector. In the 2000 Queen's Birthday Honours, he was appointed a Member of the New Zealand Order of Merit, for services to shearing and the wool industry. King is married and has four adult children.

King has had a successful sheep-shearing career and is the only left-handed shearer to ever win the Open Golden Shears in 1982. He went on to win the same title in 1987 and 1988. King was also appointed to the NZ Meat Board in 2000 representing the Northern South Island farmers for two terms before entering parliament in 2005.

== Member of Parliament ==
New Zealand Parliament
Years	Term	Electorate	List	Party
2005–2008	48th	Kaikoura	42	National
2008–2011	49th	Kaikōura	47	National
2011–2014	50th	Kaikōura	52	National

In the 2005 election, King was a candidate for the National Party, standing in the Kaikoura electorate and being ranked 42nd on the party list. He won the Kaikoura electorate receiving 17,755 votes, a margin of 4,675 over the second placed candidate Brendon Burns and entered Parliament.

In the 2008 election he successfully retained the Kaikoura electorate and increased his vote and the Party vote but was moved further down the list.

In 2011 King tied with Melissa Lee for the title of "Worst performing National MP" in the Trans Tasman Political Week's annual "Political Performance Roll-Call".

In 2012 King voted against the first reading Marriage Amendment Bill.

== Leaving Parliament ==
In 2013, King was deselected as National's candidate for Kaikoura, losing a selection challenge by Stuart Smith. King did not attend several leaving functions for retiring National MPs, most notably refusing to appear on stage at the National Party annual conference with the other departing MPs. Since leaving Parliament, King has been maintaining a low profile but is now working as a consultant in the primary industries and tertiary education sectors.

King contested the mayoralty of the Marlborough District Council at the 2016 New Zealand local elections, but lost to Blenheim ward councillor John Leggett.

Political offices
Preceded by Lynda Scott	Member of Parliament for Kaikoura; 2005–2014	Succeeded by Stuart Smith
