= Ailsa McGilvary =

New Zealand conservationist

Ailsa McGilvary QSM
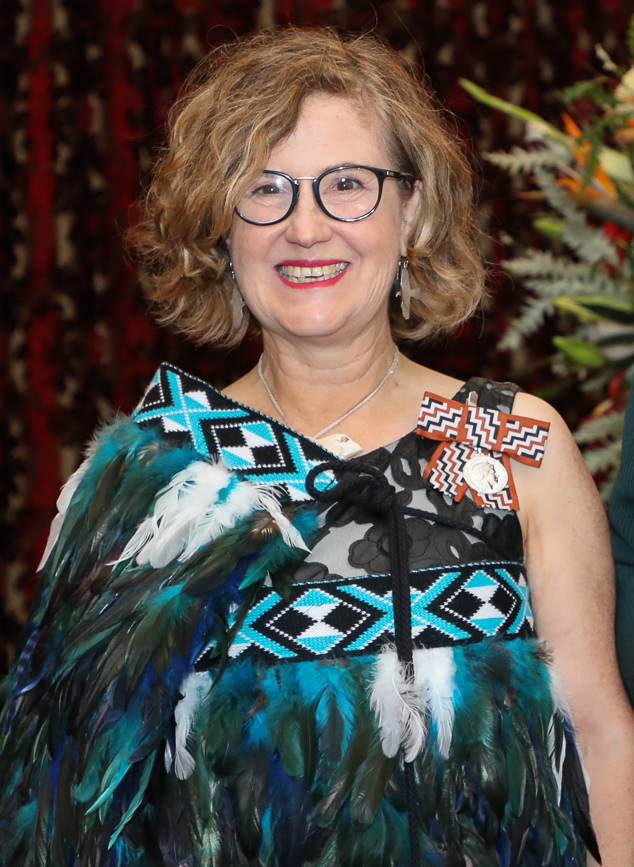
- McGilvary in 2022
- Born: Ailsa Diane McGilvary
- Education: University of Otago
- Known for: Bird conservation
- Spouse: Ted Howard

Ailsa Diane McGilvary QSM (also known as Ailsa McGilvary-Howard) is a New Zealand bird conservationist, and photographer. She is a long-term resident of Kaikōura in the South Island of New Zealand, and is known for her work with conservation of banded dotterel and Hutton's shearwater and in the Kaikōura region. McGilvary was awarded the Queen's Service Medal in 2022 for services to wildlife conservation.

== Banded dotterel conservation ==
=== Research ===
In 2012, McGilvary noted from casual observations at South Bay, Kaikōura that the banded dotterels or pohowera nesting there were having poor breeding success, with failures of all the nests that she had located. She launched a self-funded project, the Banded Dotterel Study, in the 2015/16 breeding season to systematically monitor the bird's breeding success. Of the 20 nests studied in the 2015/16 season, there were only eight chicks hatched, and just one fledgling survived. The study has continued over multiple breeding seasons, confirming the poor breeding success, with the leading cause being cat predation of eggs, chicks and adult birds. Other predators and threats she identified include hedgehogs, dogs, and disturbance from human activities.

In addition to direct observations, including cat prints in beach gravels, McGilvary has captured multiple instances of cat predation using motion-activated nest cameras. The evidence from the nest cameras revealed the type of predators, their predatory behaviour and how prevalent they were. It became clear that the predators were not just wild cats, but also pet cats, dogs and hedgehogs. When cats visit the nests, the adult birds are often too frightened to sit on the eggs. Other evidence suggested that chicks had been taken and nesting birds had been disturbed by dogs that were unleashed or not under direct control of their owner.

In the third year of the study McGilvary trialled the use of cages installed over the nests, to protect them from predators. Ultimately, this initiative was unsuccessful, and led to several bird deaths that were attributed to cats learning how to catch adult birds as they left the cage.

McGilvary's studies have shown that the local breeding population of banded dotterels is critically endangered. The 2020 breeding season was described as the worst on record, with a drop of 40% in the number of pairs nesting in the study area, and heavy losses of chicks and adult birds.

=== Advocacy work ===
In December 2015, McGilvary obtained permission from Kaikōura District Council to erect signs on the beach at South Bay, letting people know that dotterels were nesting on the beach, asking beach users on quad bikes to keep to the established tracks, to keep their dogs on a leash, and to avoid disturbing nests or chicks.

In 2017, McGilvary was interviewed on-site at South Bay beach for a Radio New Zealand programme. During the interview she described the threats to banded dotterels from predators and human interference, and her endeavours to raise community awareness and protect the birds. Her photographs of the birds were published by Radio New Zealand in an online gallery to accompany the story.

In 2019, McGilvary criticised the Kaikōura District Council for permitting a freedom camping site to be established at South Bay, immediately adjacent to banded dotterel nesting areas, and not doing enough to protect the birds, despite having named the new area Pohowera after them. The Council subsequently passed a Responsible Freedom Camping bylaw in November 2019 that prohibited freedom camping at the Pohowera (South Bay) site between 15 August and the last day in February of the following year, and limited the maximum number of vehicles to 15.

In 2020, McGilvary featured in a short film Nest 38, about the difficulties faced by the banded dotterels at Kaikōura. The film subsequently won the award for best short film at the International Wildlife Film Festival 2021. McGilvary arranged for the Minister of Conservation, Kiri Allan to attend a conservation-focused event in Kaikōura on 13 February 2021, including the screening of the film Nest 38 at the Mayfair Theatre.

In response to further predation of dotterel nests early in the 2021/22 season, McGilvary urged the local community to keep all cats contained. In an interview with New Zealand Geographic she said:

There is a very significant fine for killing a native animal. But you can do it for free if you do it with a cat.

McGilvary was chair of the Kaikōura branch of Forest and Bird from 2009. In addition to direct advocacy with beach users and other members of the public, McGilvray has made formal submissions about conservation of banded dotterels to the Kaikōura District Council and the Marlborough District Council, on behalf of the Banded Dotterel Project, and the Forest and Bird Kaikōura Branch.

== Hutton's shearwater conservation ==
McGilvary is one of the trustees of The Hutton's Shearwater Charitable Trust, formed in October 2008 to promote conservation of the endangered Hutton's shearwater or kaikōura tītī. The bird's range is Australian and New Zealand waters, but it breeds only in mainland New Zealand. Its conservation status is Endangered, because there are just two remaining breeding colonies, located in the Seaward Kaikōura Range. It is the only seabird in the world that is known to breed in alpine areas.

The work of the trust has included the establishment and maintenance of a protected area for Hutton's shearwaters to breed on the Kaikōura Peninsula. The breeding colony was established on the peninsula by translocating fledgling birds from the remaining alpine colonies into man-made burrows that are now enclosed within a predator-proof fence. McGilvary was involved in this work prior to the first translocations, and became a member of the trust in 2014.

== Wētā conservation ==
In 2011 and 2012, McGilvary launched a conservation initiative for the native insect the wētā, a giant flightless cricket that is endemic to New Zealand. The genus commonly found in the Kaikōura township is the tree wētā. McGilvary offered to rescue wētā from residential properties around the town and return them to native bush in the local area.

== Honours and awards ==
In the 2022 New Year Honours, McGilvary and her husband Ted Howard were each awarded the Queen's Service Medal, for services to conservation, particularly wildlife conservation.

== Personal life ==
McGilvary studied the piano as a child in Dunedin, and had opportunities to play the Steinway instrument in the Dunedin Town Hall during school holidays. She plays piano at church services in Kaikōura, and is the resident organist at St Paul's Presbyterian Church. McGilvary has been a local advocate for classical music. She plays piano regularly, and says about her music:

It's just become a love for me. It affects all parts of my life.

McGilvary has credited Honor Anderson, a friend and Vocational Guidance Service worker, for supporting her in her teenage years and encouraging her choice of studies. McGilvary says about Anderson:

When it was time to choose a direction, she told me: "Do Science! We need more girls in Science." So I did and I thrived. It has sent me in some amazing directions.

In an extended interview recorded by KnowledgeAble Communities, McGilvary remarked that her parents had been "birders", but that she had chosen to study plant biology, rather than animals or birds. McGilvary holds a Bachelor of Science in plant biology from the University of Otago where she studied under Alan Mark.

McGilvary is married to Ted Howard, and they are both long-term residents of Kaikōura. Her involvement with banded dotterels at South Bay, Kaikōura came about as a part of a lifestyle change following her husband's diagnosis with cancer. He bought McGilvary a camera around this time, and she became interested in the dotterels of South Bay as photographic subjects on the beach. This led to growing awareness of the birds, and their breeding behaviour and her subsequent establishment of the Banded Dotterel Study.
