= Jamie Arbuckle =

New Zealand politician

Jamie Arbuckle MP
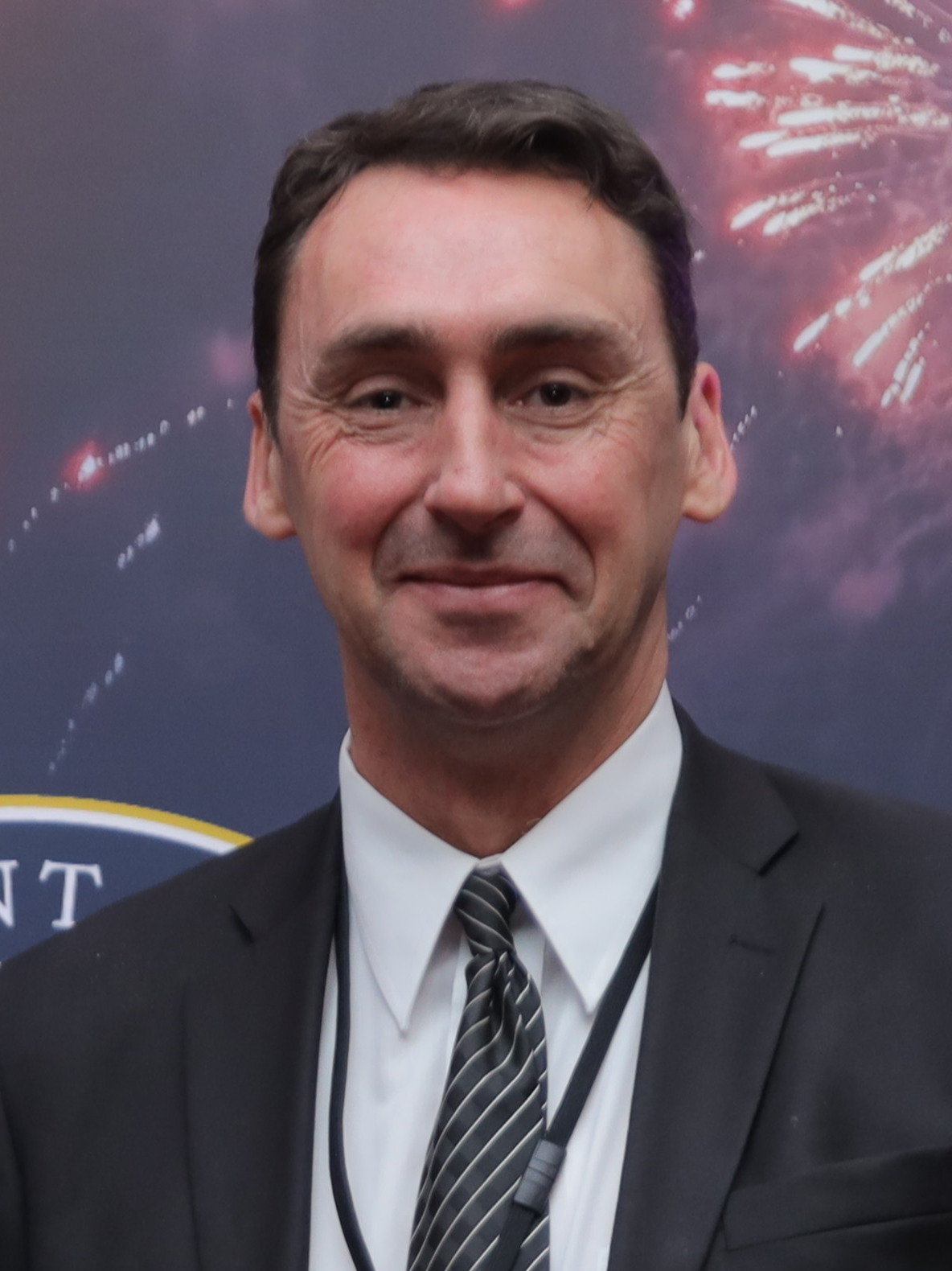
- Arbuckle in 2024

Member of the New Zealand Parliament for New Zealand First party list
- In office 14 October 2023 – 7 November 2026

Member of the Marlborough District Council
- In office 9 October 2010 – 31 October 2024
- Constituency: Blenheim Ward

Personal details
- Born: 1978 or 1979 (age 47–48)
- Party: New Zealand First
- Spouse: Sally
- Children: 4
- Profession: Orchardist

Jamie Arthur Arbuckle (born 1978 or 1979) is a New Zealand politician. He is currently a Member of Parliament in the New Zealand House of Representatives for the New Zealand First party.

Arbuckle was a Marlborough district councillor following the 2010 local elections. In the 2023 New Zealand general election, he was also elected to Parliament, and held both roles for a year. In October 2024 he resigned from his position as a district councillor. During the 2026 New Zealand general election, Arbuckle failed to enter Parliament via the electorate or party list seat based on preliminary results.

== Early life and family ==
Born in 1978 or 1979, Arbuckle grew up in Rapaura on an apple and cherry orchard. He did not know his father. Despite "not [being] academic" at school, Arbuckle went on to earn a diploma in management from Nelson Polytechnic (now the Nelson Marlborough Institute of Technology).

In 2009 Arbuckle applied to the Marlborough Farmers' Market to set up a stall selling asparagus, but questions were raised about whether he grew it himself, and his application was subsequently turned down. Arbuckle then led a group of stallholders to set up a competing market in Redwoodtown.

He is married to Sally, and they have four children. He trains racehorses as a hobby.

== Political career ==
New Zealand Parliament
| Years | Term | Electorate | List | Party |
|---|---|---|---|---|
| 2023–present | 54th | List | 6 | NZ First |

At the 2010 local elections, Arbuckle was elected to the Marlborough District Council. He was re-elected in the 2013 elections and again in the 2016 elections where he won the highest number of votes in the Blenheim Ward each time. At the 2010, 2013 and 2019 elections he also ran for mayor as well as the council but was defeated, placing second on each occasion. His wife Sally also stood for Marlborough District Council in 2019 but was unsuccessful. Both of them were elected in the 2022 local elections. He served as chair of the economic, finance and community committee at the council.

Arbuckle entered national politics when he was selected by the New Zealand First party to contest the Kaikōura electorate at the 2017 election where he finished third. He stood again in the seat at the 2020 election, finishing fourth. After this loss he joined the New Zealand First board. Selected to run a third time in Kaikōura at the 2023 general election, he was ranked 6th on the 2023 party list. Arbuckle finished in third place in the Kaikōura electorate, with 4,347 votes, but entered Parliament as one of eight New Zealand First list MPs.

Arbuckle sits on the finance and expenditure committee and is deputy chair of the justice committee. He is also the New Zealand First whip.

Arbuckle refused to resign his position as councillor in order to avoid causing a by-election; he intended to remain on council until October 2024 when a by-election would no longer be necessary to fill any vacancy he creates. When he was elected to parliament, he said he would return his council remuneration until his eventual resignation, but later changed his mind and on 6 May 2024 said he would keep it. The next day he changed his mind after being criticised for "double dipping" and said he would donate the council salary to charity. He formally resigned from council on 31 October 2024.

During the 2026 New Zealand general election scheduled for 7 November 2026, Arbuckle contested the Kaikōura electorate for NZ First and was ranked 13th place on the party list. Based on preliminary results, Arbuckle came third place in Kaikōura, with 5,376 votes. Due to his 13th place list ranking, he was not elected to Parliament on the NZ First party list.
