= Kaikōura (electorate) =

- Single-member general constituency for the New Zealand House of Representatives
- Interactive map of boundaries from the 2026 election
- Formation: 1996
- Region: Canterbury
- Character: Rural
- Term: 3 years

Member for Kaikōura
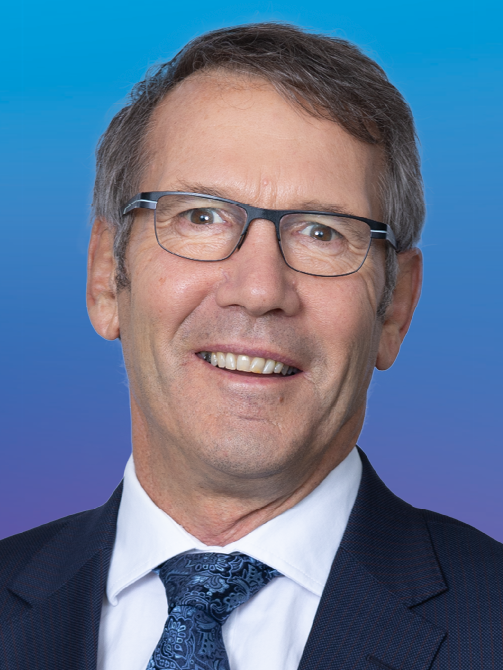
- Stuart Smith since 20 September 2014
- Party: National
- List MPs: Jamie Arbuckle (NZ First)
- Previous MP: Colin King (National)
Party vote distribution

Kaikōura (or Kaikoura before 2008) is a New Zealand parliamentary electorate, returning a single MP to the New Zealand House of Representatives. The current MP for Kaikōura is Stuart Smith of the National Party, who won the 2014 election.

== Population centres ==
Map of boundaries at the 2020 and 2023 general elections

The Kaikōura electorate covers the north-eastern South Island, from Cook Strait in the north to the Ashley River / Rakahuri in the south. At over 21,000 km^{2} (8,100 sq mi), it is New Zealand's fourth-largest general electorate by area. The electorate is named after the town of Kaikōura near the centre of the electorate. Its biggest town is Blenheim; other towns include Amberley, Ashley, Cheviot, Culverden, Goose Bay, Hanmer Springs, Havelock, Hawarden, Hurunui, Picton, Rai Valley, Renwick, Seddon, Waipara, Waiau, Wairau Valley and Ward. The electorate boundaries were not changed in the 2007, 2013/14, 2020 or 2025 boundary reviews.

== History ==
Kaikōura is one of the original 60 electorates drawn ahead of the change to Mixed Member Proportional (MMP) voting in 1996. It was made up by merging all of the old Marlborough seat with a large portion of Rangiora. Like the two electorates it replaced, Kaikōura is a safe seat for the National Party, returning a National MP at every election since it was created.

The first representative in 1996 was Doug Kidd, who was previously the MP for Marlborough. He retired at the end of the parliamentary term and was succeeded by Lynda Scott in the 1999 election. Scott served for two parliamentary terms before retiring from politics and returning to the medical profession in 2005.

The 2005 election was won by Colin King, who served for three parliamentary terms. In December 2013, King was deselected as National's candidate for Kaikoura, losing a selection challenge by Stuart Smith, who won the general election in September 2014 with a preliminary majority of 11,510 votes. Based on preliminary election results, Steffan Browning of the Green Party who became a list MP in 2011, was the highest ranked Green candidate who was not returned to parliament. When final results were released, the Green Party had gained an additional seat, and Browning was confirmed as a list MP.

=== Members of Parliament ===
Key

National Labour Green

Election	Winner
1996 election	Doug Kidd
1999 election	Lynda Scott
2002 election	Lynda Scott
2005 election	Colin King
2008 election	Colin King
2011 election	Colin King
2014 election	Stuart Smith
2017 election	Stuart Smith
2020 election	Stuart Smith
2023 election	Stuart Smith

=== List MPs ===
Members of Parliament elected from party lists in elections where that person also unsuccessfully contested the Kaikōura electorate. Unless otherwise stated, all MPs' terms began and ended at general elections.

Election	Winner
1996 election	Marian Hobbs
1999 election	Ian Ewen-Street
2002 election	Ian Ewen-Street
2011 election	Steffan Browning
2014 election	Steffan Browning
2023 election	Jamie Arbuckle

== Election results ==
=== 2026 election ===
The next election will be held on 7 November 2026. Candidates for Kaikōura are listed at Candidates in the 2026 New Zealand general election by electorate § Kaikōura. Official results will be available after 27 November 2026.

=== 2023 election ===
2023 general election: Kaikōura
Notes:	Blue background denotes the winner of the electorate vote. Pink background denotes a candidate elected from their party list. Yellow background denotes an electorate win by a list member, or other incumbent. A ✓ or ✗ denotes status of any incumbent, win or lose respectively.						
Party	Candidate	Votes	%	±%	Party votes	%	±%
National	✓ Stuart Smith	20,741	49.47	+6.79	17,281	40.92	+10.22
Labour	Emma Dewhirst	9,329	22.25	−15.01	8,714	20.63	−16.63
NZ First	Jamie Arbuckle	4,347	10.37	+5.22	3,819	9.04	+0.09
ACT	Keith Griffiths	2,624	6.26	+1.93	5,911	14.09	+2.64
Green	Richard McCubbin	2,512	5.99	+0.37	3,282	7.78	+2.47
NZ Loyal	Natalie Colello	921	2.20	—	850	2.01	—
DemocracyNZ	Sandra Campbell	509	1.21	—	269	0.64	—
New Conservative	David Greenslade	237	0.57	−1.24	111	0.26	−1.60
Independent	John McCaskey	139	0.33	—			
Independent	Ted Howard	109	0.26	+0.04			
Independent	Shuan Brown	43	0.10	—			
Opportunities					703	1.67	+0.52
NewZeal					261	0.62	+0.05
Te Pāti Māori					215	0.51	+0.35
Legalise Cannabis					176	0.42	
Leighton Baker Party					98	0.23	—
Freedoms NZ					97	0.23	—
Animal Justice					73	0.17	—
New Nation					43	0.10	—
Women's Rights					36	0.09	—
Informal votes		418			282		
Total valid votes		41,929			42,221		
National hold	Majority	11,412	27.22	+21.80			

=== 2020 election ===
2020 general election: Kaikōura
Notes:	Blue background denotes the winner of the electorate vote. Pink background denotes a candidate elected from their party list. Yellow background denotes an electorate win by a list member, or other incumbent. A ✓ or ✗ denotes status of any incumbent, win or lose respectively.						
Party	Candidate	Votes	%	±%	Party votes	%	±%
National	✓ Stuart Smith	18,069	42.68	−9.50	13,007	30.28	−22.32
Labour	Matt Flight	15,774	37.26	+10.91	19,159	44.60	+15.47
Green	Richard McCubbin	2,377	5.62	−1.64	2,282	5.31	+0.38
NZ First	Jamie Arbuckle	2,180	5.15	−5.49	1,247	2.90	−6.05
ACT	Richard Evans	1,833	4.33	+3.80	4,917	11.45	+11.07
New Conservative	David John Greenslade	766	1.81	+1.26	798	1.86	+1.52
Outdoors	Darlene Morgan	369	0.87	—	124	0.29	+0.19
Advance NZ	Lisa Claire Romana	357	0.84	—	390	0.91	—
ONE	John Donald Moore	327	0.77	—	246	0.57	—
Social Credit	John McCaskey	173	0.41	+0.33	35	0.08	+0.04
Independent	Ted Howard	93	0.22	—			
Money Free Party	Prince Bhavik	14	0.03	−0.10			
Opportunities					493	1.15	−1.02
Legalise Cannabis					193	0.32	+0.02
Māori Party					70	0.16	−0.07
Sustainable NZ					27	0.06	—
Vision NZ					10	0.02	—
TEA					7	0.02	—
Heartland					4	0.01	—
Informal votes		629			251		
Total valid votes		42,332			42,955		
National hold	Majority	2,295	5.42	−20.41			

=== 2017 election ===
2017 general election: Kaikōura
Notes:	Blue background denotes the winner of the electorate vote. Pink background denotes a candidate elected from their party list. Yellow background denotes an electorate win by a list member, or other incumbent. A ✓ or ✗ denotes status of any incumbent, win or lose respectively.						
Party	Candidate	Votes	%	±%	Party votes	%	±%
National	✓ Stuart Smith	20,594	52.18	−5.00	20,925	52.60	+0.15
Labour	Janette Walker	10,401	26.35	+3.63	11,587	29.13	+12.09
NZ First	Jamie Arbuckle	4,201	10.64	+5.44	3,561	8.95	−0.87
Green	Richard McCubbin	2,865	7.26	−1.04	1,963	4.93	−4.22
Conservative	David Greensdale	218	0.55	−2.44	135	0.34	−4.31
ACT	Richard Evans	210	0.53	+0.27	151	0.38	−0.01
Democrats	John McCaskey	131	0.33	−0.20	14	0.04	−0.06
Money Free Party	Charlotte Osmaston	53	0.13	−0.07			
United Future	John Truman Foster	51	0.13	—	23	0.06	−0.20
Opportunities					865	2.17	—
Ban 1080					119	0.30	
Legalise Cannabis					117	0.30	−0.11
Māori Party					92	0.23	−0.13
Outdoors					40	0.10	—
People's Party					10	0.03	—
Mana Party					4	0.01	—
Internet					3	0.01	—
Informal votes		381			172		
Total valid votes		39,465			39,781		
National hold	Majority	10,553	25.83	−8.63			

=== 2014 election ===
2014 general election: Kaikōura
Notes:	Blue background denotes the winner of the electorate vote. Pink background denotes a candidate elected from their party list. Yellow background denotes an electorate win by a list member, or other incumbent. A ✓ or ✗ denotes status of any incumbent, win or lose respectively.						
Party	Candidate	Votes	%	±%	Party votes	%	±%
National	Stuart Smith	20,857	57.18	−3.07	20,770	56.45	+1.04
Labour	Janette Walker	8,287	22.72	−2.98	6,269	17.04	−2.81
Green	Steffan Browning	3,028	8.30	−3.12	3,366	9.15	−2.94
NZ First	Steve Campbell	1,896	5.20	+5.20	3,612	9.82	+3.27
Conservative	Howard Hudson	1,089	2.99	+2.99	1,709	4.65	+0.85
Ban 1080	Glen Tomlinson	566	1.55	+1.55	187	0.51	+0.51
Democrats	John McCaskey	194	0.53	−0.32	36	0.10	−0.02
ACT	Richard Evans	132	0.36	−1.02	144	0.39	−0.72
Money Free Party	Ted Howard	72	0.20	+0.20			
Internet Mana					169	0.46	+0.33 (Note: 2014 Internet Mana swing is relative to the votes for Mana in 2011; it shared a party list with Internet in the 2014 election.)
Legalise Cannabis					151	0.41	−0.07
Māori Party					131	0.36	−0.07
United Future					96	0.26	−0.64
Civilian					13	0.04	+0.04
Focus					8	0.02	+0.02
Independent Coalition					8	0.02	+0.02
Informal votes		353			122		
Total valid votes		36,474			36,791		
Turnout		34,292	79.84	+5.58			
National hold	Majority	12,570	34.46	−0.08			

=== 2011 election ===
2011 general election: Kaikōura
Notes:	Blue background denotes the winner of the electorate vote. Pink background denotes a candidate elected from their party list. Yellow background denotes an electorate win by a list member, or other incumbent. A ✓ or ✗ denotes status of any incumbent, win or lose respectively.						
Party	Candidate	Votes	%	±%	Party votes	%	±%
National	✓ Colin King	19,961	60.25	+2.47	18,909	55.41	+3.57
Labour	Liz Collyns	8,516	25.70	−0.66	6,775	19.85	−8.33
Green	Steffan Browning	3,784	11.42	+3.42	3,786	11.09	+4.08
ACT	Richard Evans	457	1.38	+0.12	379	1.11	−1.98
Democrats	John McCaskey	283	0.85	+0.54	42	0.12	+0.04
Libertarianz	Ian Hayes	131	0.40	+0.40	23	0.07	+0.05
NZ First					2,236	6.55	+1.98
Conservative					1,296	3.80	+3.80
United Future					306	0.90	−0.03
Legalise Cannabis					165	0.48	+0.18
Māori Party					147	0.43	−0.13
Mana					45	0.13	+0.13
Alliance					19	0.06	-0.003
Informal votes		1,045			284		
Total valid votes		33,132			34,128		
National hold	Majority	11,445	34.54	+3.13			

Electorate (as at 26 November 2011): 45,958

=== 2008 election ===
2008 general election: Kaikoura
Notes:	Blue background denotes the winner of the electorate vote. Pink background denotes a candidate elected from their party list. Yellow background denotes an electorate win by a list member, or other incumbent. A ✓ or ✗ denotes status of any incumbent, win or lose respectively.						
Party	Candidate	Votes	%	±%	Party votes	%	±%
National	✓ Colin King	20,374	57.77	+6.65	18,479	51.83	+6.81
Labour	Brian McNamara	9,297	26.36	−11.30	10,046	28.18	−7.86
Green	Steffan Browning	2,823	8.00	+2.46	2,499	7.01	+1.24
Kiwi	Al Belcher	1,127	3.20	+3.20	618	1.73	+1.73
NZ First	Linda Waimarie King	959	2.72	+2.72	1,631	4.58	−1.29
ACT	Dave Tattersfield	443	1.26	+0.46	1,101	3.09	+1.63
United Future	Coralie Christie	131	0.37	−1.01	331	0.93	−1.90
Democrats	John S. J. McCaskey	112	0.32	+0.32	31	0.09	+0.02
Progressive					285	0.80	−0.81
Bill and Ben					223	0.63	+0.63
Māori Party					201	0.56	+0.18
Legalise Cannabis					107	0.30	+0.10
Family Party					41	0.12	+0.12
Alliance					21	0.06	−0.06
Workers Party					12	0.03	+0.03
RONZ					8	0.02	+0.002
Libertarianz					6	0.02	−0.01
Pacific					6	0.02	+0.02
RAM					4	0.01	+0.01
Informal votes		292			160		
Total valid votes		35,266			35,650		
National hold	Majority	11,077	31.41	+17.95			

=== 2005 election ===
2005 general election: Kaikoura
Notes:	Blue background denotes the winner of the electorate vote. Pink background denotes a candidate elected from their party list. Yellow background denotes an electorate win by a list member, or other incumbent. A ✓ or ✗ denotes status of any incumbent, win or lose respectively.						
Party	Candidate	Votes	%	±%	Party votes	%	±%
National	Colin King	17,755	51.68		15,636	45.02	
Labour	Brendon Burns	13,080	38.07		12,515	36.04	
Green	Steffan Browning	1,927	5.61		2,005	5.07	
United Future	Robin Westley	481	1.40		981	2.82	
Progressive	John Maurice	430	1.25		558	1.61	
ACT	Pat O'Sullivan	275	0.80		505	1.45	
Māori Party	Brett Cowan	174	0.51		133	0.38	
Independent	Ted Howard	170	0.49				
Alliance	Greg Kleis	64	0.19		40	0.12	
NZ First					2,036	5.86	
Destiny					139	0.40	
Legalise Cannabis					68	0.20	
Christian Heritage					43	0.12	
Democrats					24	0.07	
One NZ					13	0.04	
99 MP					10	0.03	
Libertarianz					9	0.03	
RONZ					7	0.02	
Direct Democracy					4	0.01	
Family Rights					3	0.01	
Informal votes		335			147		
Total valid votes		34,356			34,729		
National hold	Majority	4,675	30.30	13.61			

=== 2002 election ===
2002 general election: Kaikoura
Notes:	Blue background denotes the winner of the electorate vote. Pink background denotes a candidate elected from their party list. Yellow background denotes an electorate win by a list member, or other incumbent. A ✓ or ✗ denotes status of any incumbent, win or lose respectively.						
Party	Candidate	Votes	%	±%	Party votes	%	±%
National	✓ Lynda Scott	15,165	47.63	+9.56	8,536	26.51	−6.51
Labour	Brendon Burns	12,096	37.99		12,636	39.25	+4.16
Green	Ian Ewen-Street	2,313	7.26	−1.91	2,220	6.90	+0.20
United Future	Julee Smith-Mischeski	644	2.02	+1.06 (Note: Percentage change calculated as a candidate for the Future New Zealand Party in the 1999 election)	1,859	5.77	
Christian Heritage	Don Moore	639	2.01	−1.02	508	1.58	−1.46
ACT	Ted Howard	458	1.44		1,873	5.82	−0.77
Progressive	Philippa Main	365	1.15		570	1.77	
Independent	Desmond J Bell	161	0.51	+0.14			
NZ First					2,825	8.77	+5.18
ORNZ					821	2.55	
Alliance					197	0.61	−7.78
Legalise Cannabis					125	0.39	−0.33
One NZ					17	0.05	+0.01
Mana Māori					4	0.01	0.00
NMP					3	0.01	+0.01
Informal votes		303			98		
Total valid votes		31,841			32,194		
National hold	Majority	3,069	9.64	+5.01			

=== 1999 election ===
1999 general election: Kaikoura
Notes:	Blue background denotes the winner of the electorate vote. Pink background denotes a candidate elected from their party list. Yellow background denotes an electorate win by a list member, or other incumbent. A ✓ or ✗ denotes status of any incumbent, win or lose respectively.						
Party	Candidate	Votes	%	±%	Party votes	%	±%
National	Lynda Scott	12,214	38.07		10,688	33.02	−3.18
Labour	Brian McNamara	10,728	33.44		11,357	35.09	+12.06
Green	Ian Ewen-Street	2,941	9.17	−6.47 (Note: Percentage change calculated as a candidate for the Alliance Party in the 1996 election)	2,168	6.70	
Alliance	Lindsay Mehrtens	2,040	6.36		2,717	8.39	−4.94
NZ First	Chris Rivers	1,300	4.05		1,161	3.59	−10.70
ACT	Graham James Hewett	1,234	3.85		2,134	6.59	+0.78
Christian Heritage	Don Moore	971	3.03		985	3.04	
Christian Democrats	Julee Smith-Mischeski	307	0.96		324	1.00	
McGillicuddy Serious	Rodney Hansen	176	0.55	−0.53	81	0.25	−0.12
Independent	Desmond Joseph Bell	120	0.37	0.00			
Natural Law	Anne Brigid	48	0.15	−0.13	88	0.27	−0.06
Legalise Cannabis					234	0.72	−0.39
United NZ					186	0.57	−0.02
South Island					103	0.32	
Libertarianz					64	0.20	+0.19
Animals First					48	0.15	+0.02
One NZ					12	0.04	
Mana Māori					4	0.01	0.00
The People's Choice					4	0.01	
Mauri Pacific					3	0.01	
Freedom Movement					2	0.01	
NMP					1	0.00	
Republican					1	0.00	
Informal votes		578			292		
Total valid votes		32,079			32,365		
National hold	Majority	1,486	4.63	−12.9			

=== 1996 election ===
1996 general election: Kaikoura
Notes:	Blue background denotes the winner of the electorate vote. Pink background denotes a candidate elected from their party list. Yellow background denotes an electorate win by a list member, or other incumbent. A ✓ or ✗ denotes status of any incumbent, win or lose respectively.						
Party	Candidate	Votes	%	±%	Party votes	%	±%
National	Doug Kidd	13,858	41.09		12,280	36.20	
Labour	Marian Hobbs	7,946	23.56		7,813	23.03	
NZ First	Tom Harrison	5,332	15.81		4,849	14.29	
Alliance	Ian Ewen-Street	5,275	15.64		4,522	13.33	
ACT	Peter King-Talbot	731	2.17		1,970	5.81	
McGillicuddy Serious	Rodney Hansen	365	1.08		125	0.37	
Independent	Desmond Joseph Bell	124	0.37				
Natural Law	Anne Brigid	94	0.28		112	0.33	
Christian Coalition					1,496	4.41	
Legalise Cannabis					378	1.11	
United NZ					199	0.59	
Progressive Green					80	0.24	
Animals First					43	0.13	
Green Society					25	0.07	
Conservatives					8	0.02	
Advance New Zealand					6	0.02	
Superannuitants & Youth					5	0.01	
Libertarianz					5	0.01	
Asia Pacific United					3	0.01	
Mana Māori					3	0.01	
Ethnic Minority Party					0	0.00	
Te Tawharau					0	0.00	
Informal votes		291			95		
Total valid votes		33,725			33,921		
National win new seat	Majority	5,912	17.53				
