= Lynda Scott =

New Zealand politician

Lynda Marie Scott is a former New Zealand politician of the National Party.

== Early life ==
Scott trained as a nurse in Wellington and then became a doctor in Auckland. She worked as a geriatrician. For a time, she also served as a director of Blenheim radio company Marlborough Media, which owned Sounds FM and Easy FM.

== Member of Parliament ==
New Zealand Parliament
Years	Term	Electorate		Party
1999–2002	46th	Kaikoura	56	National
2002–2005	47th	Kaikoura	12	National

Scott was first elected to Parliament in the 1999 election, winning the South Island seat of Kaikoura. She replaced Doug Kidd, a long-serving National MP who had opted to become a list MP. In 2002, she became National's spokesperson for health. On 21 July 2004, however, she announced that she would retire from politics at the next election, returning to her "first love", medicine.

Political offices
Preceded by Doug Kidd	Member of Parliament for Kaikoura; 1999–2005	Succeeded by Colin King
