= Gavan Herlihy =

New Zealand politician

Gavan Herlihy (born 16 January 1947) is a New Zealand former politician. He was educated at St. Kevin's College and University of Canterbury. He was a member of Parliament for the National Party from 1996 to 2002.

Before entering politics, Herlihy was a farmer.

== Member of Parliament ==
New Zealand Parliament
Years	Term	Electorate	List	Party
1996–1999	45th	Otago	57	National
1999–2002	46th	Otago	32	National

Herlihy was first elected to Parliament in the 1996 election as MP for Otago, and was re-elected in the 1999 election. In the 2002 election, he lost narrowly to David Parker of the Labour Party.

This loss was surprising to many commentators, as the Otago region has traditionally regarded as a safely in National hands. Herlihy narrowly missed out on becoming a list MP, being two places below the cut-off line.

== After parliament ==
On 1 July 2011 Herlihy was appointed to the board of Landcare Research.

Herlihy is involved in rural support trusts.

New Zealand Parliament
Preceded by Warren Cooper	Member of Parliament for Otago; 1996–2002	Succeeded by David Parker
