= Tim Barnett (politician) =

New Zealand politician

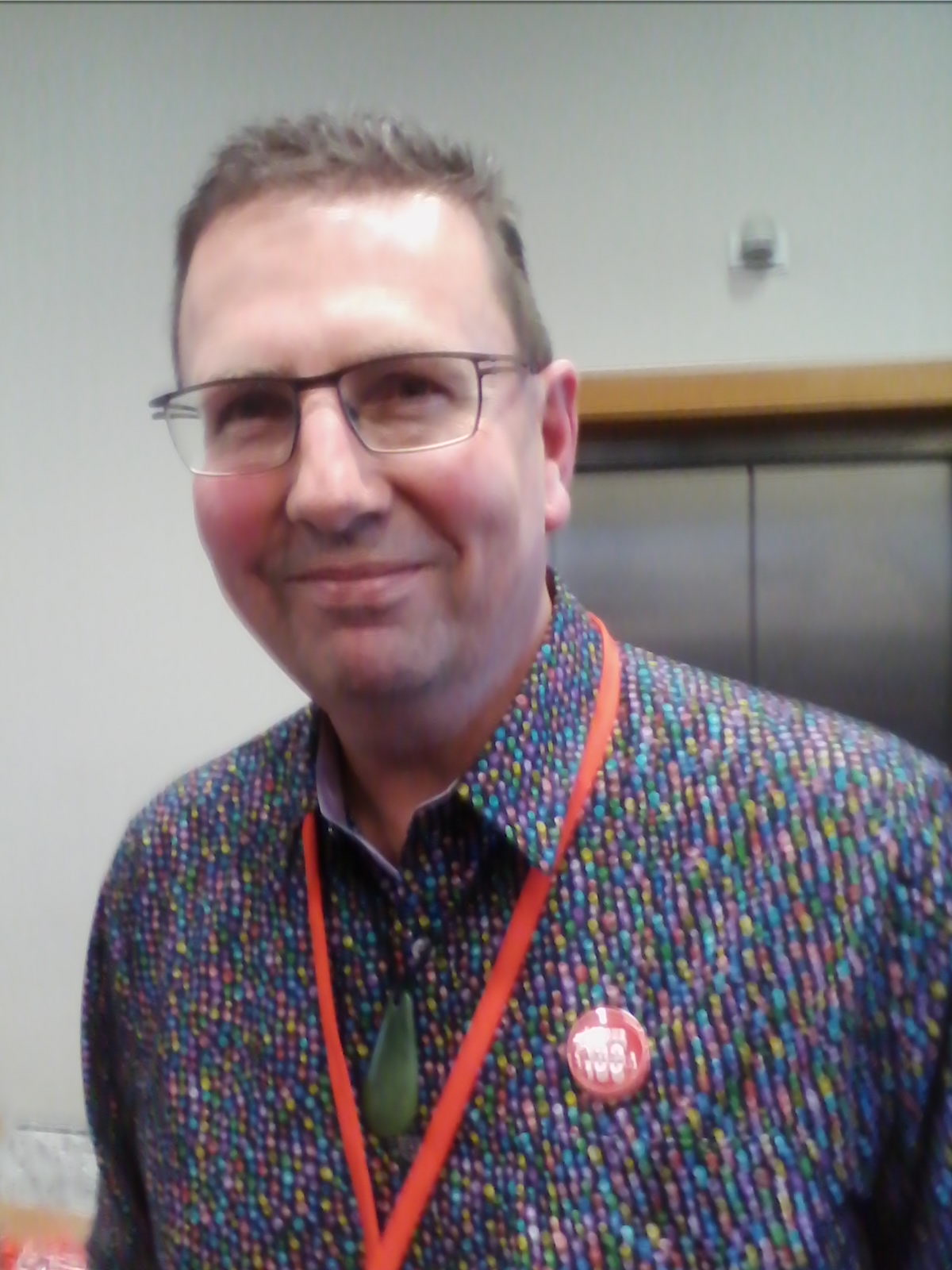

Member of the New Zealand Parliament for Christchurch Central
- In office 1996–2008
- Preceded by: Lianne Dalziel
- Succeeded by: Brendon Burns

Personal details
- Born: Timothy Andrew Barnett; 4 August 1958 (age 68) Rugby, Warwickshire, England
- Party: New Zealand Labour Party; Labour Party (UK)
- Occupation: Chief Executive
- Website: timbarnett.org.nz

Timothy Andrew Barnett (born 4 August 1958) is a New Zealand politician who was the member of the New Zealand House of Representatives for Christchurch Central from 1996 to 2008, representing the Labour Party. He is a British immigrant to New Zealand and New Zealand's second openly gay politician. Barnett moved to South Africa in 2009 to work in the field of HIV/AIDS. He returned to New Zealand in 2012 when he was appointed by the Labour Party as their general secretary.

== Early life ==
Born in Rugby, Warwickshire, England, on 4 August 1958, he moved to New Zealand in 1991 with his former partner, Jonathan Kirkpatrick. Educated at the London School of Economics, graduating with a B.Sc. (Honours) in Economics (Government) in 1981. In the United Kingdom he had been the inaugural executive director of the Stonewall Lobby Group, which was the first professional lobby group set up in that country to work for equal rights for lesbian and gay people.

== Member of Parliament ==
New Zealand Parliament
Years	Term	Electorate	List	Party
1996–1999	45th	Christchurch Central	none	Labour
1999–2002	46th	Christchurch Central	none	Labour
2002–2005	47th	Christchurch Central	none	Labour
2005–2008	48th	Christchurch Central	none	Labour

He was elected to Parliament as the Member of Parliament (MP) for Christchurch Central in 1996. He has been active in many community-based organisations in New Zealand, including the lesbian, gay and transgender (LGBT) section of the Labour Party, (Rainbow Labour) which he helped to found in 1997, and is a supporter of UniQ, the Queer Students Association at New Zealand universities. He was the Parliamentary promoter of the Prostitution Law Reform Bill, a Bill in his name, which became law in 2003 and thus made New Zealand the first country in the world to decriminalise prostitution, and an outspoken supporter of the Civil Union Bill, which became law in 2004 and made New Zealand the first country outside Europe to legislate for equal relationship status for lesbian and gay couples. He was appointed Senior Government Whip after the 2005 election. He was known to be very active in his local electorate chairing a Youth Advisory Committee as well as being a regular contributor to the St Albans Neighbourhood News.

At the 2005 general election, Barnett was re-elected with 52.35% of the vote and a majority of 6,694. He retired at the 2008 general election.

== After Parliament ==
Barnett was appointed as the global programmes manager for the World AIDS Campaign in February 2009 and was based in Cape Town, South Africa.

In July 2012, Barnett returned to New Zealand and was appointed as general secretary of the Labour Party.

In October 2015, Barnett was appointed to the iwi tribal authority of the Ngāi Tūhoe as the Group Manager for Iwi (Tribe) based at the Southern Hemisphere's largest living building, Te Uru Taumatua, in Taneatua. In that role Barnett held the portfolio's Health, Housing, Education and Social Well-Being. Barnett resided in the rural township of Ruatoki during that period.

Barnett led the Wellington-based financial counselling organisation FinCap from 2017 to 2020.

To date, Barnett also supports and assist with iwi governance strategic planning as an advisor and a mentor to Members of the New Zealand Parliament.

In 2025 Barnett was appointed chief executive of the Community Trust of Mid and South Canterbury.

New Zealand Parliament
Preceded by Lianne Dalziel	Member of Parliament for Christchurch Central; 1996–2008	Succeeded by Brendon Burns
Party political offices
Preceded by Chris Flatt	General Secretary of the Labour Party; 2012–2016	Succeeded by Andrew Kirton
Preceded by Jill Pettis	Senior Whip of the Labour Party; 2005–2008	Succeeded by Darren Hughes
