= Young ACT =

Youth organisation in New Zealand

- Logo since 2023
- Founded: 1996
- Ideology: Classical liberalism Libertarian conservatism
- Position: Centre-right to right-wing
- Mother party: ACT New Zealand
- Website: youngact.org.nz

Young ACT, formerly known as Prebble's Rebels, ACTivists and ACT on Campus, is a youth group affiliated with ACT New Zealand, a classical-liberal political party in New Zealand. It has supported the party for over two decades though has disagreed with ACT policy on issues such as alcohol and drug restrictions.

In 2020, a number of Young ACT members resigned over an alleged culture of sexual harassment within the group, and an independent investigation into the claims was launched. As of March 2021, no information from this investigation has been publicly released.

== Creation and names ==
The youth division of the ACT Party was formed in 1996 at Victoria University of Wellington. The group was called "Prebble's Rebels" after the party's then-leader Richard Prebble. The name of the group changed several times: it changed to "ACTivists" in 2000, later became "ACT on Campus", then most recently became 'Young ACT'.

The group has also had the nickname "Killer Bees", derived from their yellow T-shirts.

== Present status ==
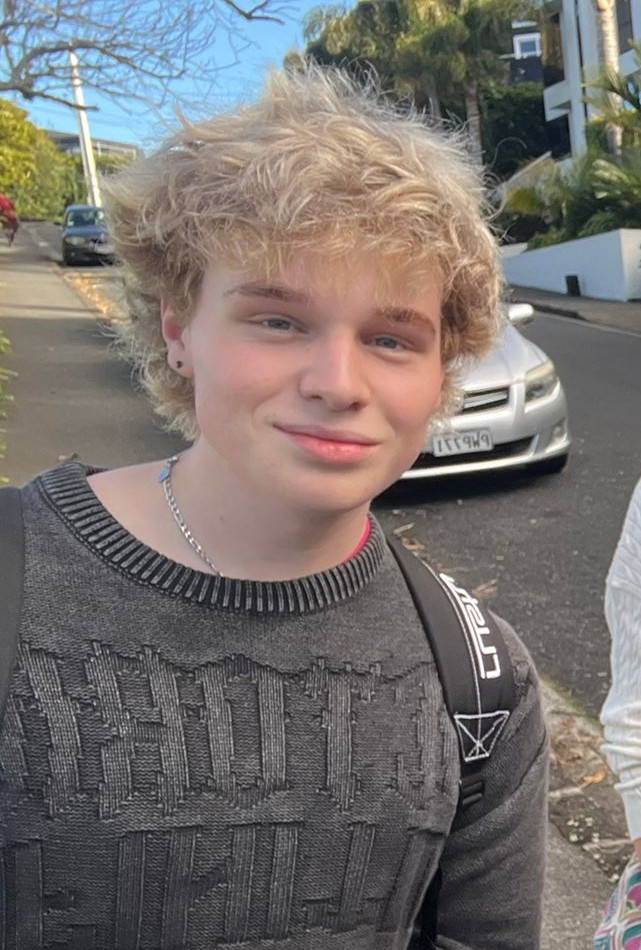
Current President Quill Thomas in 2026

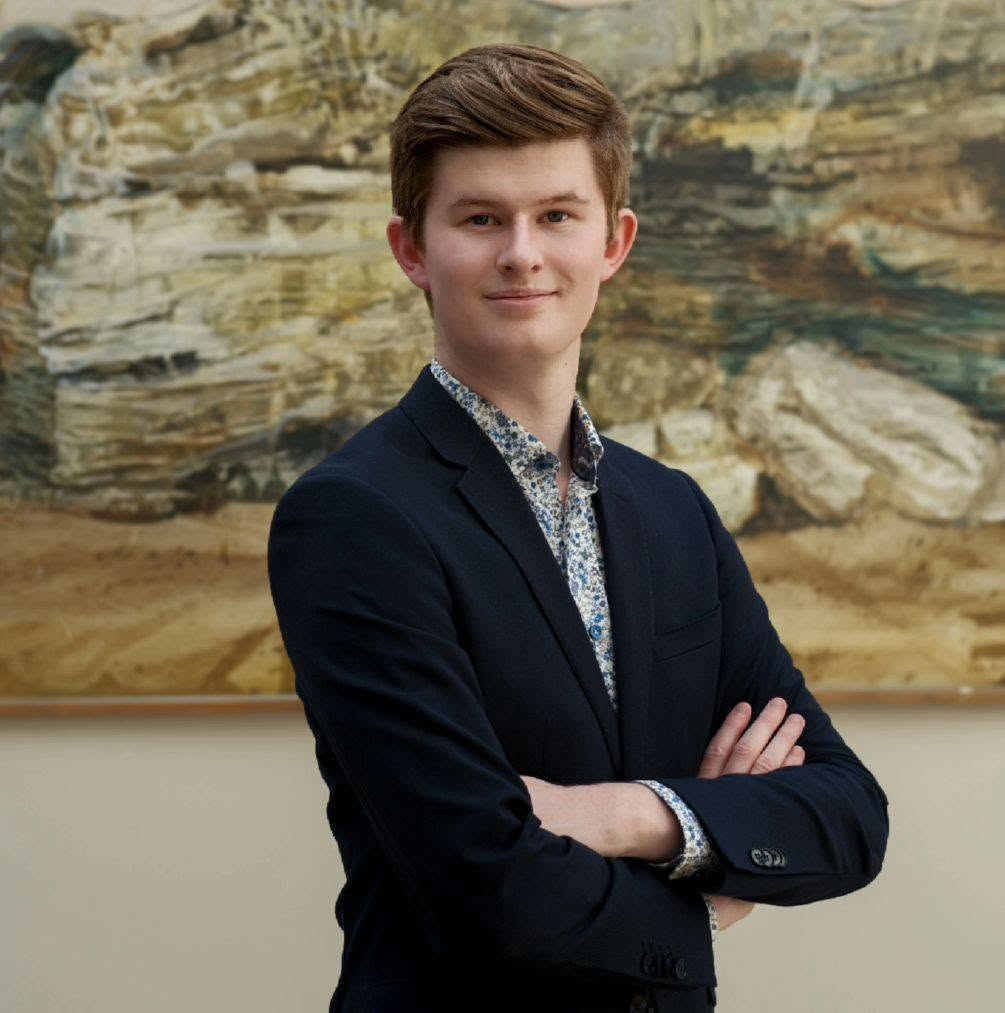
Young ACT Vice President, Matthew Fisken.

As of July 2021, Young ACT has a club at the University of Auckland. The president of Young ACT is Quill Thomas, who was elected to the position in June 2026 along with vice president Matthew Fisken.

As of 2025 there are three main clubs Auckland: Run by Quill Thomas Wellington: Run by James Sales Canterbury: Run by Jacob Crume Otago and Waikato does not currently have leaders.

== Relationship with the ACT Party ==
Young ACT is not an official youth wing of the ACT Party. It has been described as an affiliated group and as a group "separate from ACT", one that is not under the party's control but is allowed to use the party's logo and name so long as it "doesn't bring the party into disrepute". ACT Party leader David Seymour said that this means ACT's oversight and pastoral care responsibilities were limited. According to Young ACT's website as of August 2020, "Young ACT operates independently from the ACT party. While Young ACT may support the ACT party nothing on this site is indicative of the ACT party's beliefs or opinions."

=== Support and connections ===
Young ACT members have supported the ACT party in its campaigning. Members accompanied party candidate John Banks throughout his campaign in the 2011 general election, after which David Seymour said that the youth supporters were proof that the party could survive. Young ACT also created the Facebook group "David Seymour Memes For Over-taxed Liberal Teens" which posted about ACT events during the 2017 campaign.

Members of Young ACT have also been involved directly with ACT. These have included:

- David Seymour: the chairman and president of the youth group while studying at Auckland University became ACT's leader in 2014 and was elected to Parliament.
- James McDowall: a member of the youth group from 2005 to 2011, McDowall was heavily involved in the Education (Freedom of Association) Amendment Bill campaign. He became an ACT board member and then was elected to parliament in the 2020 election.
- Hayden Fitzgerald: Fitzgerald was president of the youth group and an ACT Party Board member at the same time.
- Peter McCaffrey: the president of the youth group during 2011 also stood for ACT in the 2008 general election for the Otaki electorate.
- Myah Deedman: the former secretary of Young ACT stood for ACT in the 2020 general election for the Hamilton East electorate.
- Matthew Fisken: the current vice president of Young ACT stood for ACT in the 2023 general election for the Christchurch Central electorate

In a 2013 interview, the youth group's president called the relationship "solid".

=== Disagreements ===
The group was told off by the ACT Party in 1996 after vandalising a Labour candidate's billboards.

In 2012, when then-leader and sole ACT MP John Banks decided to vote against keeping the drinking age at 18, the youth group's president said the decision was "shortsighted, and goes against the ACT Party principles of choice and personal responsibility". The group said they would pull support at the next election campaign if he did not vote to keep the drinking age at 18. In 2013, Young ACT disagreed with the ACT Party on the GCSB Bill and the Telecommunications (Interception Capability and Security) or "TICS" Bill. John Banks supported the bills, while the youth group's vice president wrote an editorial in Critic Te Ārohi expressing the group's opposition.

In March 2020, ACT Party leader David Seymour threatened to strip Young ACT of their name, following plans by Young ACT to sell drug paraphernalia at an event to promote its drug policy. Whereas Young ACT seeks legalisation of several drugs, Seymour said that Young ACT's policy is not something "you'll see anytime soon" and that legalising drugs is "not a political priority" for him. Seymour said that if the group goes too far "we'll take away the name". Young ACT president Felix Poole said that they had not told the ACT Party about their plans as "we don't consult them on stunts like this". Young ACT did display drug paraphernalia at the group's stall, none of which were illegal items. Seymour visited the stall, and said that members of Young ACT had not broken the law and would remain Act members.

== Campaigns ==
=== Keep It 18 – Liquor laws ===
In 2011, Young ACT was part of a campaign called Keep It 18. This was a joint campaign that sought to keep the drinking age at 18 and saw the group join with youth groups from three other parties. The campaign began in 2006 to oppose the Sale of Liquor (Youth Alcohol Harm Reduction: Purchase Age) Amendment Bill. According to a press release from the group, it circulated a banner to campuses around the country that was "signed by hundreds of students and young people who oppose efforts to raise the drinking age." It also opposed the Alcohol Reform Bill that was introduced in 2010. Keep It 18's opposition to the Alcohol Reform Bill included a submission to Parliament. In both cases, the drinking age remained at 18.

=== Legalisation of drugs ===
Young ACT opposed making the party pill BZP illegal, which done in 2008. In the month before the ban came into effect, members sold party pills for $1 each to Auckland University students if they joined the organisation. The group said that around 500 members joined during the promotion. The move was called "grossly irresponsible" by Associate Health Minister Jim Anderton. ACT Party president Garry Mallet said that it was not the best way to "win the battle for freedom" and that he would talk to the group.

In 2020, Young ACT released a policy which supported the legalisation of all drugs in New Zealand. The policy proposed that all drugs be legalised and regulated to varying degrees according to how harmful they are. For example, cannabis, LSD, and other low-risk drugs would be regulated in a framework similar to that of alcohol, whereas more serious drugs like heroin and methamphetamine would be regulated in a prescription model similar to that of Switzerland.

=== Voluntary student membership ===
In 2011, Young ACT supported the Education (Freedom of Association) Amendment Bill. The bill made membership of student associations voluntary; it was a private member's bill by ACT MP Roger Douglas and was supported by the National Party.

Young ACT members arranged for about 60 members and friends to attend a meeting of the Victoria University of Wellington Students' Association in October 2009 to have the association support the bill. Young ACT president Peter McCaffrey said that the meeting voted in favour of the bill, but the association Executive declared that the meeting was invalid and was struck from the records.

The group faced criticism when it posted a quote that compared compulsory union membership to gang rape. McCaffrey said there were no plans to delete the post, and ACT member Heather Roy said she would not ask the group to do so. However, the post was later removed. A few months later, a member of the youth group, Cameron Browne, told the Auckland University Students' Association treasurer to "get raped" in a Facebook conversation. McCaffrey said Browne should have "chosen a different swear word or called her something else" and that Browne had apologised on Facebook, but said that the screenshot of the conversation had been cut and hid the treasurer's remarks.

The Education (Freedom of Association) Amendment bill received royal assent on 30 September 2011 and came into force on 1 January 2012.

=== Marriage equality ===
ACT on Campus supported the Marriage (Definition of Marriage) Amendment Act 2013 which allowed same-sex couples to marry. The group issued a joint statement with four other groups in 2012, urging their MPs to support the bill.

=== Tobacco and vaping ===
According to its website, Young ACT "has opposed increases in tobacco tax year after year". Young ACT opposes regulations on vaping.

=== Opposition of Earth Hour ===
The group opposed Earth Hour in 2010. In a TV interview, president Rick Giles said electricity would be needed in any coming apocalyptic event and promoted Edison Hour as a celebration of technology.

=== University rent strike ===
In 2020, Young ACT supported a rent strike, where students were refusing to pay a weekly fee for rooms they were unable to occupy due to COVID-19 restrictions.

=== Other promotions ===
In 2008, Young ACT handed out free condoms printed with slogans such as "screw Labour, vote ACT" and in 2011 handed out KFC Double Downs saying the burger is "a symbol of the freedom of choice all New Zealanders should enjoy".

== Sexual harassment ==
In May 2020, the vice president of Young ACT, Ali Gammeter, resigned the position, saying that "for months I have been sexually harassed, slutshamed, and ignored" and that she was "not the only victim of this behaviour in our ranks". She said that the majority of women in Young ACT had experienced some form of sexual harassment from other members. The day after Gammeter's announcement Young ACT published a statement on its Facebook page which said that "prevalent and systematic incidents of harm have occurred within [the] organisation" and that there had been "justified criticism surrounding how our members and those using our platforms interact with each other." The statement said that the group had "removed a number of the members in question", that it had created an equity committee, and that it would investigate reports of sexism and harassment. The ACT Party has also said it was considering investigating and offered to "provid[e] Ms Gammeter with any support she requires".

When approached for comment, National President Felix Poole declined to be interviewed but said that the youth wing had asked Gammeter to create a sexual harassment and bullying policy after she complained about being sexually harassed by members of the group earlier in 2020.

Between Gammeter's resignation and July 2020, three more main members publicly resigned from the group, citing experiences of alleged sexual assault and harassment and a toxic culture. One resigning member said "it is hard to find the words to describe the environment the Young ACT executive has created for victims"; another, who was a member of the newly formed equity committee, said "The issue with having an equity document is that it's useless if you're not going to enforce it." Newsroom reviewed a collection of online messages and posts from pages affiliated with Young ACT and said: "The messages are sexually explicit, and are not appropriate for publication. They include jokes about sexual assault, including rape, and sexual harassment."

It was announced that an independent investigation into Gammeter's claims would be conducted by an employment lawyer. In July 2020 this report was "expected in coming weeks" and ACT Party leader David Seymour said he expected that an anonymised summary of the report would be publicly released, despite Gammeter having requested that the party does not publish any part of the report. As of March 2021, the report still has not been released. After the ACT party received the final report they decided to take no further action, with Gammeter saying "this whole process was really traumatic for all of the victims and it's a real shame that ACT couldn't get this right.”
