= Otago (electorate) =

Otago was a New Zealand parliamentary electorate first created for the 1978 election, which was replaced by the Waitaki electorate and Clutha-Southland electorates for the 2008 election. Its last representative was Jacqui Dean of the National Party.

== Population centres ==
The 1977 electoral redistribution was the most overtly political since the Representation Commission had been established through an amendment to the Representation Act in 1886, initiated by Muldoon's National Government. As part of the 1976 census, a large number of people failed to fill out an electoral re-registration card, and census staff had not been given the authority to insist on the card being completed. This had little practical effect for people on the general roll, but it transferred Māori to the general roll if the card was not handed in. Together with a northward shift of New Zealand's population, this resulted in five new electorates having to be created in the upper part of the North Island. The electoral redistribution was very disruptive, and 22 electorates were abolished, while 27 electorates were newly created (including Otago) or re-established. These changes came into effect for the 1978 election.

When the electorate was first formed, it mostly replaced the Otago Central electorate, but also gained areas from the Clutha electorate (including Tapanui and Lawrence) and the coastal strip north of Dunedin from the Oamaru electorate (including Waikouaiti, Palmerston, and Hampden). The main towns that came from the Otago Central electorate were Queenstown, Alexandra, Cromwell, and Wānaka. In the 1983 electoral redistribution, the southern boundary moved north and some towns transferred to the Clutha electorate, including Tapanui, Lawrence, and Roxburgh. To compensate, some outer suburbs of Dunedin on the northern part of Otago Peninsula were gained from the Dunedin North electorate, including St Leonards and Ravensbourne.

The electoral redistribution carried out for the 1996 election saw the electorate move further north to now include Twizel. The electoral redistribution carried out after the 2006 census saw Otago abolished, with its area split between the Waitaki and Clutha-Southland electorates.

== History ==
The Otago electorate was first won by Warren Cooper of the National Party in 1978, who had been the representative for the Otago Central electorate since the 1975 election. When Cooper retired at the 1996 election, he was succeeded by Gavan Herlihy. Although Otago was a reasonably safe seat for the National Party, that party's poor showing at the 2002 election saw the Otago constituents elect a Labour MP, David Parker. Three years later in 2005, a swing to National in provincial New Zealand unseated Parker in favour of National's Jacqui Dean. When the Otago electorate was abolished in 2008, Dean transferred to the Waitaki electorate.

=== Members of Parliament ===
Key

National Labour ACT

Election	Winner
1978 election	Warren Cooper
1981 election	Warren Cooper
1984 election	Warren Cooper
1987 election	Warren Cooper
1990 election	Warren Cooper
1993 election	Warren Cooper
1996 election	Gavan Herlihy
1999 election	Gavan Herlihy
2002 election	David Parker
2005 election	Jacqui Dean
(Electorate abolished in 2008; see Waitaki)

=== List MPs ===
Members of Parliament elected from party lists in elections where that person also unsuccessfully contested the Otago electorate. Unless otherwise stated, all MPs' terms began and ended at general elections.

Election	Winner
1999 election	Gerry Eckhoff
2002 election	Gerry Eckhoff
2005 election	David Parker

== Election results ==
=== 2005 election ===
2005 general election: Otago
Notes:	Blue background denotes the winner of the electorate vote. Pink background denotes a candidate elected from their party list. Yellow background denotes an electorate win by a list member, or other incumbent. A ✓ or ✗ denotes status of any incumbent, win or lose respectively.						
Party	Candidate	Votes	%	±%	Party votes	%	±%
National	Jacqui Dean	17,364			16,333		
Labour	✗ David Parker	15,369			14,573		
Green	Jane Pearce	1,596			2,251		
ACT	Gerry Eckhoff	848			585		
United Future	Gerald Telford	620			783		
Progressive	Barry Silcock	270			389		
Democrats	Richard Prosser	133			53		
Direct Democracy	Simon Guy	88			36		
NZ First					1,407		
Destiny					132		
Legalise Cannabis					106		
Māori Party					63		
Christian Heritage					38		
Alliance					26		
99 MP					11		
Libertarianz					10		
Family Rights					7		
RONZ					6		
One NZ					4		
Informal votes		331			104		
Total valid votes		36,288			36,813		
National gain from Labour	Majority	1,995					

=== 2002 election ===
2002 general election: Otago
Notes:	Blue background denotes the winner of the electorate vote. Pink background denotes a candidate elected from their party list. Yellow background denotes an electorate win by a list member, or other incumbent. A ✓ or ✗ denotes status of any incumbent, win or lose respectively.						
Party	Candidate	Votes	%	±%	Party votes	%	±%
Labour	David Parker	14,113			12,943		
National	✗ Gavan Herlihy	13,429			8,472		
ACT	Gerry Eckhoff	1,294			1,919		
United Future	Allan Smellie	1,115			1,779		
Christian Heritage	Mike Ferguson	544			431		
Progressive	Hessel van Wieren	438			528		
Alliance	Sam Huggard	441			260		
Green					2,598		
NZ First					2,127		
ORNZ					635		
Legalise Cannabis					232		
One NZ					19		
NMP					7		
Mana Māori					4		
Informal votes		489			92		
Total valid votes		31,374			31,954		
Labour gain from National	Majority	684					

=== 1999 election ===
Refer to Candidates in the New Zealand general election 1999 by electorate#Otago for a list of candidates.

=== 1987 election ===
1987 general election: Otago
Party	Candidate	Votes	%	±%
National	Warren Cooper	9,234	51.4	+9.1
Labour	Calvin Fisher	7,232	40.5	+4.8
Democrats	W J Thompson	1,279	7.1	−7.8
Wizard Party	Ms P Johnstone	178	1.0	+1.0
Majority		1,961	10.9	
Turnout			88.6	
Registered electors		20,563		

=== 1984 election ===
1984 general election: Otago
Party	Candidate	Votes	%	±%
National	Warren Cooper	8,884	42.3	−7.5
Labour	David Polson	7,509	35.7	+10.3
Social Credit	W J Thompson	2,124	14.9	−9.9
NZ Party	F H Chittock	1,501	7.1	+7.1
Majority		1,375	6.6	
Turnout			95.2	
Registered electors		22,500		

=== 1981 election ===
1981 general election: Otago
Party	Candidate	Votes	%	±%
National	Warren Cooper	9,970	49.8	−0.3
Labour	Bryan Griffiths	5,077	25.4	−4.3
Social Credit	M J Robertson	4,951	24.8	+7.0
Majority		4,893	24.4	
Turnout			91.5	
Registered electors		21,938		

=== 1978 election ===
1978 general election: Otago
Party	Candidate	Votes	%	±%
National	Warren Cooper	9,109	50.1	−2.2
Labour	R J Rutherford	5,387	29.7	−10.7
Social Credit	H Te H Ruru	3,326	17.8	+13.2
Values	Mrs J Pitches	430	2.4	−0.3
Majority		3,722	20.4	
Turnout			73.9	
Registered electors		24,668		
