= Fanny (name) =

- Gender: Feminine

Origin
- Meaning: Hypocorism of Frances or Stephanie

Other names
- Related names: Frances, Fancy, Fannie, Francie, Frankie, Stephanie

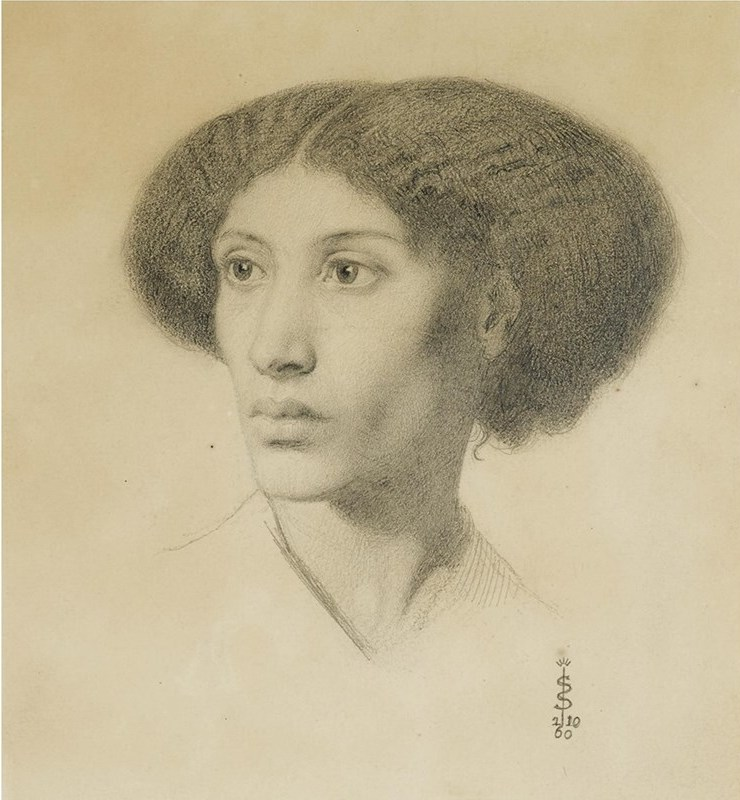
Fanny Eaton by Simeon Solomon

Fanny is a feminine given name. It originated as a diminutive of the English given name Frances or the French Françoise, both meaning "free one", and of the Spanish name "Estefanía" and the French name Stéphanie, both meaning "crown".

Fanny was a popular independent given name as well as a diminutive of other popular names in the 18th and 19th centuries. Usage of the name has been steadily declining in the Anglosphere since the end of the 19th century. In British English, fanny has been a vulgar slang term for vagina or vulva since the 1830s. In American English, fanny is a slang term for the buttocks that has been in use since World War I. In New Zealand in 2023, the Registrar-General declined to accept the name for a baby's birth certificate because it might cause offense.

The name Fanny or Fannie has remained well-used in other languages and other countries. In the United States, the name Fanny and the spelling variant Fannie are still well-used by the Amish cultural group, who speak Pennsylvania Dutch. The name also remains in regular use in other countries, including France, Germany, Hungary, Denmark, and Sweden.

== Women ==
=== Given name ===
- Fanny Adams (1859–1867), English murder victim
- Fanny Agostini (born 1988), French journalist and television presenter
- Fanny Ahlfors (1884–1947), Finnish politician
- Fanny Alaux (1797–1880), French artist
- Fanny Alger (c. 1816–1889), Alleged first plural wife of Joseph Smith
- Fanny Alving (1874–1955), Swedish poet and novelist
- Fanny Ardant (born 1949), French actress
- Fanny Arden (1859–1955), New Zealand artist
- Fanny Altendorfer, Austrian luger who competed in the late 1920s
- Fanny Balbuk (1840–1906), prominent Noongar Whadjuk woman who lived in Perth, Western Australia
- Fanny Bastien (born 1961), French actress
- Fanny Amelia Bayfield (died 1891), English-born Canadian artist and educator
- Fanny de Beauharnais (1737–1813), French lady of letters and salon holder, born Marie-Anne-Françoise Mouchard
- Fanny Bendixen (1820–1899), hotelier and saloon keeper during the gold-rush period in British Columbia
- Fanny Blood (1758–1785), English illustrator and educator and longtime friend of Mary Wollstonecraft
- Fanny Yarborough Bickett (1870–1941), American social worker and political hostess
- Fanny Blankers-Koen (1918–2004), Dutch track and field athlete, Olympic and world champion and world record holder
- Fanny Blomé (born 1989), Swedish model and beauty pageant titleholder
- Fanny Bornedal (born 2000), Danish actress
- Fanny Bouvet (born 1994), French diver
- Fanny Brennan (1921–2001), French-American surrealist painter
- Fanny Britt (born 1977), Canadian playwright and translator living in Quebec
- Fanny Brownbill (1890–1948), Australian pioneering politician
- Fanny Buitrago (born 1943), Colombian fiction writer and playwright
- Fanny Cadeo (born 1970), Italian showgirl, model, television personality and singer
- Fanny Calder (1838–1923), promoter of education in domestic subjects in Liverpool
- Fanny Cano (1944–1983), Mexican actress and producer
- Fanny Carby (1925–2002), British actress
- Fanny Hallock Carpenter (1854–1939), American lawyer and clubwoman
- Fanny Carlsen, German screenwriter of the silent era
- Fanny Carrió (fl. 1879–1949), Uruguayan liberal feminist
- Fanny DuBois Chase (1828–1902), American social reformer and author
- Fanny Charrin (1781–1854), French portrait painter specializing in miniatures
- Fanny Chmelar (born 1985), German alpine skier
- Fanny Chollet (born 1991), Swiss pilot
- Fanny Churberg (1845–1892), Finnish landscape painter
- Fanny Clamagirand (born 1984), French classical violinist
- Fanny Clar (1875–1944), French journalist, writer and socialist
- Fanny Colonna (1934–2014), French-Algerian sociologist and anthropologist
- Fanny Jackson Coppin (1837–1913), African-American educator and missionary
- Fanny Corbaux (1812–1883), British painter and biblical commentator
- Fanny Cornforth (1835–1909), model and mistress of painter Dante Gabriel Rossetti, real name thought to be Sarah Cox
- Fanny Corri-Paltoni, English operatic soprano active in Europe between 1818 and 1835
- Fanny Cory (1877–1972), American artist and illustrator best known for her comic strip Little Miss Muffet
- Fanny Cottençon (born 1957), French actress
- Fanny Crosby (1820–1915), American mission worker, poet, lyricist, and composer
- Fanny Curtis (1908–2003), American sportswoman
- Fanny Currey (1848–1917), Irish horticulturalist and watercolour painter
- Fanny Davenport (1850–1898), Anglo-American stage actress
- Fanny Vining Davenport (1829–1891), English actress
- Fanny Davies (1861–1934), British pianist
- Fanny Deakin (1883–1968), English politician
- Fanny Deberghes (born 1994), French swimmer
- Fanny Murdaugh Downing (1831–1894), American author and poet
- Fanny Duberly (1829–1903), English soldier's wife who wrote a journal of her experiences
- Fanny Eagles (1836–1907), British Anglican deaconess
- Fanny Edelman (1911–2011), Argentine politician
- Fanny Carter Edson (1887–1952), American petroleum geologist
- Fanny Elssler (1810–1884), Austrian ballerina
- Fanny Elsta (1899–1978), Norwegian opera singer
- Fanny Fields (1880–1961), American singer, dancer and comic entertainer
- Fanny Fischer (born 1986), German sprint canoer
- Fanny Furner (1864–1938), Australian activist for the rights of women and children
- Fanny Garrido (1846–1917), Spanish writer
- Fanny Gjörup (1961–2001), Swedish actress
- Fanny Chambers Gooch (1842–1913), American author
- Fanny Good (1860–1950), New Zealand artist
- Fanny Grattan Guinness (1831–1898), British writer, evangelist and trainer of missionaries
- Fanny Hausmann (1818–1853), Slovenian writer and poet
- Fanny Hensel (1805–1847), German composer and pianist, sister of composer Felix Mendelssohn
- Fanny Herrero (born 1974), French television screenwriter
- Fanny Hertz (1830–1908), British educationalist and feminist
- Fanny Hjelm (1858–1944), Swedish visual artist
- Fanny Holland (1847–1931), English singer and comic actress
- Fanny Howe (1940–2025), American poet, novelist and short story writer
- Fanny Ingvoldstad (1857–1935), Norwegian painter
- Fanny Jacques-André-Coquin (born 1987), stage name Fanny J, French singer
- Fanny Kaplan (1890–1918), Russian attempted assassin of Vladimir Lenin, born Feiga Haimovna Roytblat
- Fanny Kekelaokalani (1806–1880), member of the royal family of the Kingdom of Hawaii, and mother of a Queen consort
- Fanny Ketter (born 1996), Swedish actress
- Fanny Lam Christie (born 1952), Hong Kong sculptor
- Fanny E. Lacy (c. 1786–1869), British writer and activist
- Fanny Lång (born 1996), Swedish footballer
- Fanny Langdon (1864–1899), American zoologist
- Fanny Law (born 1953), Hong Kong civil servant
- Fanny Létourneau (born 1979), Canadian synchronized swimmer
- Fanny Lewald (1811–1889), German author and feminist
- Fanny López Jiménez (born 1970), Mexican archaeologist
- Fanny Loy (1917-unknown), Argentine actress, dancer and singer
- Fanny Peabody Mason (1864–1948), American heiress, philanthropist
- Fanny Mikey (c. 1930–2008), Argentine-born Colombian actress, theatre producer and entrepreneur
- Fanny Mills (1860–1899), British-American circus performer
- Fanny E. Minot (1847–1919), American public worker
- Fanny Moser (baroness) (1848–1925), Swiss noblewoman
- Fanny Moser (scientist) (1872–1953), Swiss-German zoologist
- Fanny Murray (1729–1778), English courtesan
- Fanny Östlund (born 1997), Swedish tennis player
- Fanny Bury Palliser (1805–1878), English writer on art and lace
- Fanny Purdy Palmer (1839–1923), American author, lecturer and activist
- Fanny Peltier (born 1997), French sprinter
- Fanny Addison Pitt (1847–1937), English actress
- Fanny Runnells Poole (1863–1940), American writer and book reviewer
- Fanny Puyesky (1939–2010), Uruguayan lawyer, writer and dramatist known as "the first feminist" of Uruguay
- Fanny Ramos (born 1995), French kickboxer
- Fanny Raoul (1771–1833), French feminist writer, journalist, philosopher and essayist
- Fanny Rinne (born 1980), German field hockey player
- Fanny Rosenfeld, also known as Bobbie Rosenfeld (1904–1969), Canadian multi-sport athlete
- Fanny Rozet (1881–1958), French sculptor
- Fanny Rubio (born 1949), Spanish academic
- Fanny Rush, British portrait painter
- Fanny Searls (1851–1939), American doctor and botanical collector
- Fanny Sidney (born 1987), French actress, director and screenwriter
- Fanny Smith (born 1992), Swiss freestyle skier
- Fanny Cochrane Smith (1834–1905), Aboriginal Tasmanian considered the last fluent speaker of the Flinders Island lingua franca and thus the Tasmanian languages
- Fanny Bixby Spencer (1879–1930), American philanthropist and antiwar writer
- Fanny Stål (1821–1889), Swedish pianist
- Fanny Stollár (born 1998), Hungarian tennis player
- Fanny Sunesson (born 1967), Swedish golf caddie
- Fanny Tenret (born 1990), French footballer
- Fanny Tercy (1782–1851), French historical novelist
- Fanny Thibout (1907–1998), Belgian dancer and folklorist
- Fanny Vágó (born 1991), Hungarian footballer
- Fanny Valette (born 1986), French actress
- Fanny Waterman (1920–2020), English musician, founder of the Leeds International Piano Competition
- Fanny Westerdahl (1817–1873), Swedish dramatic stage actress

=== Pet form of Frances ===
- Fanny Alger (1817–1889), American alleged first plural wife of Latter Day Saints founder Joseph Smith
- Fanny Allen (1784–1819), first woman from New England to become a Catholic nun
- Fanny Blood (1758–1785), English illustrator and educator, and longtime friend of Mary Wollstonecraft
- Fanny Brawne (1800–1865), engaged to poet John Keats
- Fanny Brough (1852–1914), British stage actress
- Frances Burney (1752–1840), English novelist, diarist and playwright
- Fanny Chamberlain (1825–1905), American First Lady of Maine
- Fanny Crosby (1820–1915), American Methodist rescue mission worker, poet, lyricist and composer
- Fanny Durack (1889–1956), Australian swimmer
- Fanny Fitzwilliam (1801–1854), English stage actress and theatre manager
- Fanny Hamlin (born 1987), also known as Faye (musician), Swedish former singer, songwriter, and model
- Fanny Imlay (1794–1816), illegitimate daughter of the British writer and feminist Mary Wollstonecraft
- Fanny Kemble (1809–1893), English actress, writer and anti-slavery figure
- Fanny Knight (1793–1882), English niece and correspondent of the novelist Jane Austen
- Frances Nelson (1761–1831), wife of Admiral Horatio Nelson
- Frances Sargent Osgood (1811–1850), American poet
- Fanny Parkes (1794–1875), Welsh travel writer
- Fanny Rowe (1913–1988), English stage, film and television actress
- Fanny Steers (1797–1861), English watercolourist, landscapist, author and composer
- Fanny Stevenson (1840–1914), wife of writer Robert Louis Stevenson
- Frances Wimperis (1840–1925), New Zealand artist

=== Pet form of Francesca ===
- Fanny Cerrito (1817–1909), Italian ballet dancer and choreographer

=== Pet form of Francisca ===
- Fanny Anitùa (1887–1969), Mexican contralto opera singer

=== Pet form of Françoise ===
- Fanny Dillon (1785–1836), French noblewoman
- Fanny Geefs (1807–1883), Belgian painter of Irish descent
- Fanny Mosselman (1808–1880), Belgian noble and salonist
- Fanny Krumpholtz Pittar (1781–1862), Bohemian harpist and composer

=== Pet form of Franziska ===
- Fanny von Arnstein (1758–1818), Austrian socialite and salonnière
- Fanny Elssler (1810–1884), Austrian ballerina
- Fanny Hausmann (1818–1853), Slovenian writer and poet of German origin
- Fanny Schreck (1877–1951), German actress
- Fanny von Starhemberg (1875–1943), Austrian politician
- Fanny Tarnow (1779–1862), German writer born

=== Pen name ===
- Fanny Cradock, English restaurant critic, television cook and writer Phyllis Pechey (1909–1994)
- Fanny Fern, Sara Willis (1811–1872), American newspaper columnist, humorist, novelist and author of children's stories

=== Stage name ===
- Fanny Brice, American comedian, actress and singer Fania Borach (1891–1951)
- Fanny Heldy, Belgian operatic soprano born Marguerite Virginie Emma Clémentine Deceuninck (1888–1973)
- Fanny Lu, Colombian singer-songwriter and actress Lucía Martínez Buenaventura (born 1973)
- Fanny Lumsden, Australian country music singer and songwriter Edwina Lumsden (born 1986)

== Men ==
- Fanny Amun (born 1962), Nigerian former football player and coach
- Fanny Walden (1888–1949), English footballer and cricketer

== Fictional characters ==
- Fanny Hill, the protagonist of Memoirs of a Woman of Pleasure, an erotic novel by John Cleland
- Fanny Price, heroine of Jane Austen's 1814 novel Mansfield Park
- Fanny (Guilty Gear), video game character
- Fanny (Sesame Street), children's television character
- Flapper Fanny, cartoon character
- Lord Fanny, from the DC Comics series The Invisibles
- Madame Fanny La Fan, in the BBC sitcom 'Allo 'Allo!

== Animals ==
- Fanny (elephant) (born 1940s), female Asian elephant who spent the majority of her life in a small zoo in Pawtucket, Rhode Island
