= Radcliffe Zoological Laboratory =

The Radcliffe Zoological Laboratory was created in 1894 when Radcliffe College rented a room on the fifth floor of the Museum of Comparative Zoology at Harvard University to convert into a women's laboratory. In the 1880s Elizabeth Cary Agassiz, director of the Harvard Annex (which would become chartered as Radcliffe College in 1894), negotiated for the use of space for her students in the Museum of Comparative Zoology. Prior to the acquisition of this space, science laboratories were taught using inadequate facilities, converting spaces such as bathrooms in old houses into physics laboratories, which Harvard professors often refused to teach in.

== Physical space and arrangements ==
The laboratory space was converted from an office or storage closet, and was sandwiched between other invertebrate storage rooms. This small space was poorly lit and often cramped, as this was the only space Radcliffe women technically had access to. In 1908, in response to pressure from Radcliffe administrators to construct a women's restroom, Alexander Agassiz launched an inquiry about which spaces women were occupying within the building. Agassiz rejected the construction of this restroom because it would obstruct light from hallway windows, despite the fact that the closest women's restrooms to the Radcliffe Zoological Laboratory were within the Natural History Museum galleries, two floors below. Agassiz found that, while Harvard men occupied 14 rooms, Radcliffe women were spilling over from their single designated laboratory space into 3 other rooms. Herbert Spencer Jennings highlighted that segregating instruction by gender was challenging due to the limitation of space, noting that

Sometimes no room is vacant for the Radcliffe lecture, and [Professor George Howard] Parker takes one of his classes of girls into a room where there are a number of men doing laboratory work, and gives the lectures there."

Agassiz felt that the resources within the Museum of Comparative Zoology should not be ceded to Radcliffe, stating that 'it cannot expect us to sacrifice M.C.Z. for its needs in anyway'.

== Institutional affiliations and degrees ==
Radcliffe did not grant PhDs until 1902. Between 1894 and 1902, multiple students completed all course and thesis requirements for a PhD degree in the department of Zoology, without receiving the title. Margaret Lewis Nickelson studied the nervous system of marine invertebrates, publishing three papers in well-regarded journals. Florence Mayo, Annie Henchman, and Julia B. Platt also conducted original research on topics varying from canine teeth of sheep to the nervous systems of slugs. While zoology courses became standard for Radcliffe students by the early 20th century, the refusal to grant doctoral degrees resulted in very little funding or institutional support for long-term research projects for women. This lack of funding led students such as Fanny Langdon to pursue long daily commutes after she moved in with relatives in Jamaica Plain, five miles away from the laboratory in Cambridge. Edith Nason Buckingham was the first to receive a Radcliffe PhD in Zoology in 1910.
