= Furner =

Furner is an English surname literally meaning "baker", ultimately from Latin furnarius.

- David Furner (born 1971), Australian rugby player and coach, son of Don
- Don Furner (1932–2020), Australian rugby player and coach
- Fanny Furner (1864–1938), Australian human rights activist
- Jim Furner (1927–2007), Australian military intelligence officer, director-general of ASIS
- John Furner, American business executive
- Luke Furner (1837–1912), Australian politician
- Mark Furner (born 1958), Australian politician
- Mary O. Furner, American historian

== See also ==
- Furner, South Australia, a locality
