= Edith Nason Buckingham =

American zoologist

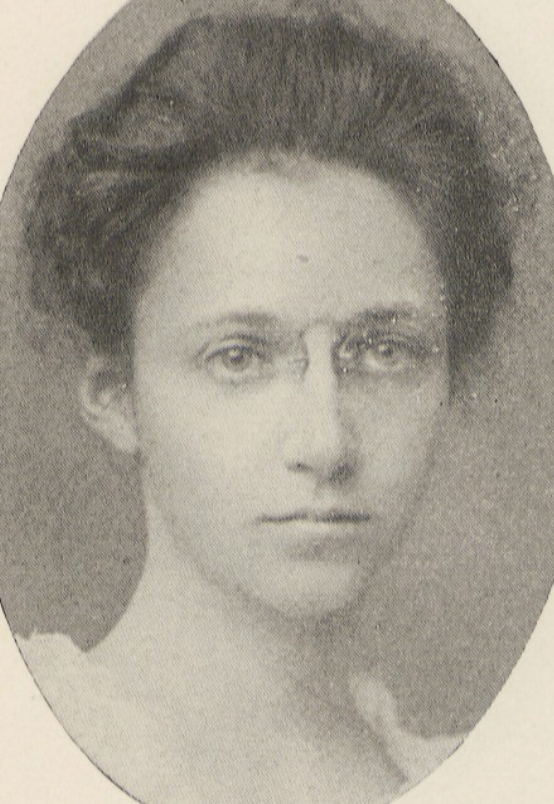
- Edith Nason Buckingham, from the 1902 yearbook of Radcliffe College
- Born: September 28, 1877; Boston, Massachusetts
- Died: February 23, 1954 (aged 76); Sudbury, Massachusetts
- Occupations: Zoologist, businesswoman, chicken farmer, dog breeder

Edith Nason Buckingham (September 28, 1877 – February 23, 1954) was an American zoologist, dog breeder, and chicken farmer. She was the first woman to earn a Ph.D. in zoology at Radcliffe College.

== Early life ==
Buckingham was born in Boston, the daughter of Edward Marshall Buckingham and Alice Darracott Nason Buckingham. Her father and grandfather were both Harvard-trained physicians. Her sister Margaret married biochemist Addison Gulick. She attended Girls Latin School and the Curtis-Peabody School. She attended Radcliffe College, graduating in 1902, and was president of the Radcliffe Science Club.

In 1910, Buckingham became the first woman to earn a Ph.D. in zoology at Radcliffe, with a dissertation titled "Division of Labor among Ants" (1911). Her supervisor was Edward Laurens Mark at Harvard Zoological Laboratory. In connection with that project, she also wrote "A Light-Weight, Portable Outfit for the Study and Transportation of Ants" (1909), published in The American Naturalist.

== Career ==
Buckingham worked at the Bermuda Biological Station for Research after college, and taught science at high schools in Concord and Abington, Massachusetts. She was an active member of Phi Beta Kappa.

From 1927, Buckingham and her partner owned and operated Featherland Farm, a chicken farm in Sudbury, Massachusetts. The farm grew to a large business, including farm equipment rentals. She also bred and raised show dogs, and was a founding member of the New England Old English Sheep Dog Club. She was a member of the Sudbury Woman's Club and the Sudbury Garden Club, and taught Sunday school at an Episcopal church. She claimed that the "Grandmother's house" of Lydia Maria Child's 1844 "Over the river and through the wood" lyric was her farmhouse in Sudbury.

== Personal life ==
Buckingham lived and worked with Emily G. Fish. Edith N. Buckingham died in 1954, at a Sudbury town meeting, aged 78 years. After her death, the Framingham District Kennel Club gave a Memorial Trophy in her name. Some of her correspondence is in the Gulick Family Papers at the Massachusetts Historical Society.
