= Marlborough Ridge =

Settlement in Marlborough, New Zealand

- Interactive map of Marlborough Ridge
- Coordinates: 41.537°S 173.875°E
- Country: New Zealand
- Region: Marlborough
- Ward: Wairau-Awatere General Ward; Marlborough Māori Ward
- Electorates: Kaikōura; Te Tai Tonga (Māori)

Government
  - Territorial Authority: Marlborough District Council
  - Marlborough District Mayor: Nadine Taylor
  - Kaikōura MP: Stuart Smith
  - Te Tai Tonga MP: Tākuta Ferris

Area
  - Total: 3.04 km^{2} (1.17 sq mi)

Population (June 2025)
  - Total: 340
  - Density: 110/km^{2} (290/sq mi)

Marlborough Ridge is a subdivision of Fairhall in Marlborough, New Zealand. It is located directly west of Marlborough Golf Course, and was developed from the late 1990s. Marlborough Ridge Reserve is a small park in the subdivision.

== Demographics ==
Marlborough Ridge is described by Statistics New Zealand as a rural settlement and covers 3.04 km^{2} (1.17 sq mi). It had an estimated population of 340 as of June 2025, with a population density of 112 people per km^{2}. It is part of the Woodbourne statistical area.

Historical population
Year	Pop.	±% p.a.
2006	51	—
2013	168	+18.57%
2018	228	+6.30%
2023	306	+6.06%
The 2006 population is for a smaller area of 1.51 km^{2}. Source:

Marlborough Ridge had a population of 306 in the 2023 New Zealand census, an increase of 78 people (34.2%) since the 2018 census, and an increase of 138 people (82.1%) since the 2013 census. There were 141 males and 165 females in 123 dwellings. 3.9% of people identified as LGBTIQ+. The median age was 57.3 years (compared with 38.1 years nationally). There were 45 people (14.7%) aged under 15 years, 15 (4.9%) aged 15 to 29, 141 (46.1%) aged 30 to 64, and 108 (35.3%) aged 65 or older.

People could identify as more than one ethnicity. The results were 94.1% European (Pākehā); 3.9% Māori; 4.9% Asian; and 1.0% Middle Eastern, Latin American and African New Zealanders (MELAA). English was spoken by 98.0%, and other languages by 9.8%. No language could be spoken by 1.0% (e.g. too young to talk). New Zealand Sign Language was known by 1.0%. The percentage of people born overseas was 23.5, compared with 28.8% nationally.

Religious affiliations were 37.3% Christian, 1.0% Islam, 2.9% Buddhist, 1.0% Jewish, and 1.0% other religions. People who answered that they had no religion were 50.0%, and 6.9% of people did not answer the census question.

Of those at least 15 years old, 99 (37.9%) people had a bachelor's or higher degree, 123 (47.1%) had a post-high school certificate or diploma, and 39 (14.9%) people exclusively held high school qualifications. The median income was $54,000, compared with $41,500 nationally. 72 people (27.6%) earned over $100,000 compared to 12.1% nationally. The employment status of those at least 15 was 111 (42.5%) full-time and 45 (17.2%) part-time.
