= International Council of Organizations of Folklore Festivals and Folk Arts =

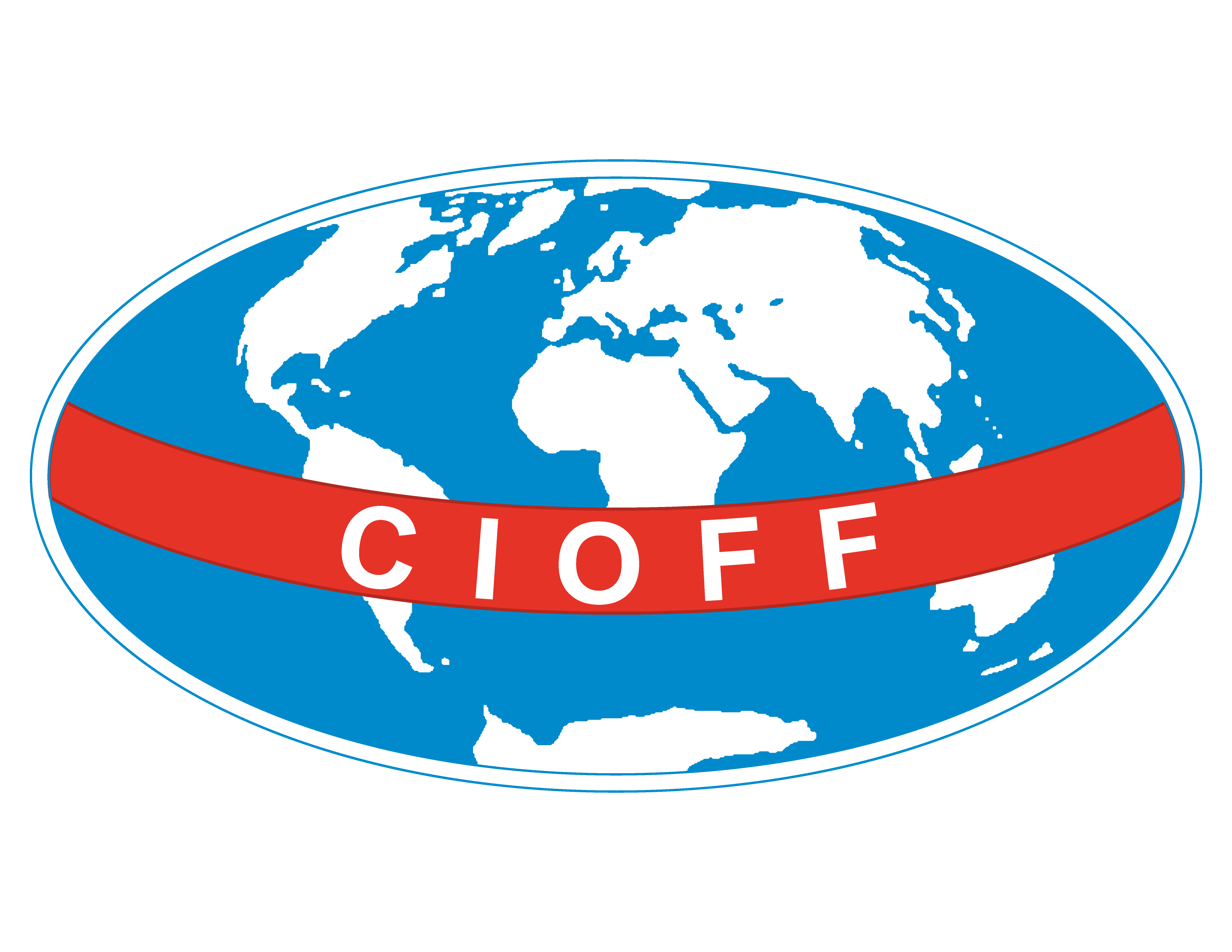
CIOFF® Logo

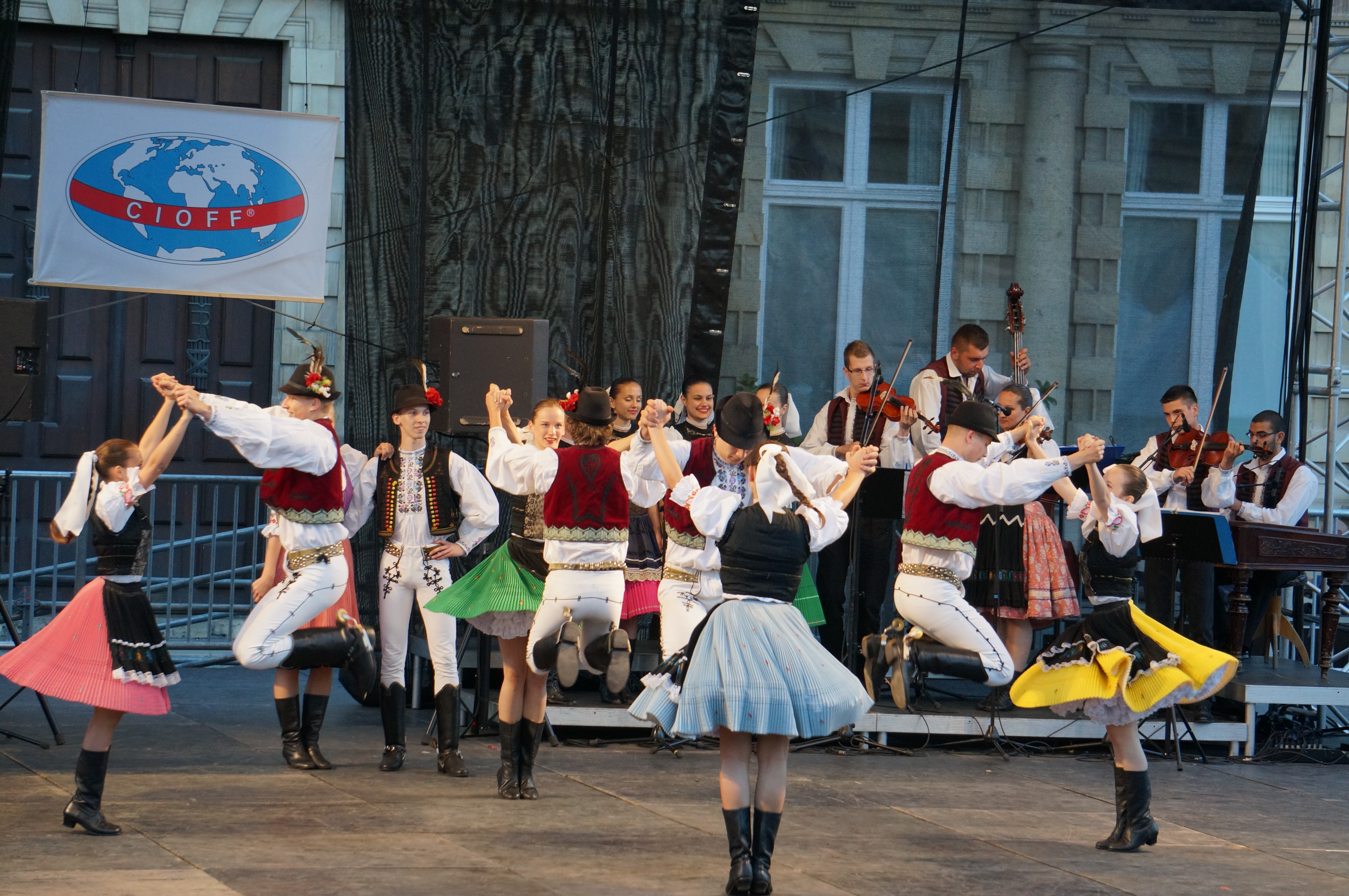
Folklore Group performing at a CIOFF® Festival.

The International Council of Organizations of Folklore Festivals and Folk Arts (CIOFF®, French: Conseil international des organisations de festivals de folklore et d'arts traditionnels) is an international nongovernmental organization (NGO) in Official partnership with UNESCO and is accredited to the Committee of the UNESCO Convention for the Safeguarding of Intangible Cultural Heritage, aiming to promote traditional culture, folklore and intangible cultural heritage through folklore festivals and folklore groups around the world.

== History ==
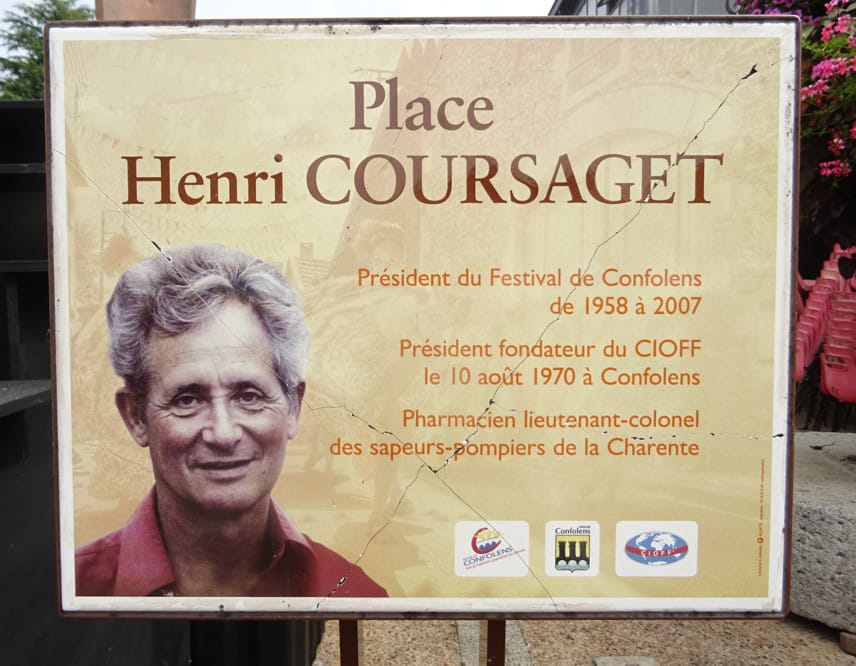
Henri Coursaget's square in Confolens, France

In 1968, Henri Coursaget, director of the Folklore Festival in Confolens, France had the idea to invite young people from Syria, Egypt, Lebanon and Israel to perform and share their culture. A high level call ordered Coursaget to cancel the meeting and this was enough for him to understand the power of his work. According to Coursaget's words:

In August 1969 I put forward a draft plan for the organisation. I visualized the composition of a ”Council – International – of Organizers of Folklore Festivals” thus forming the word C.I.O.F.F., and we sent out the invitations for a meeting in 1970. I invited friends from Belgium, Italy, Hungary, the Netherlands, Portugal, Romania, Spain, Switzerland, Yugoslavia and the UK. I also invited a very close friend from the Ministry of Culture in Warsaw, Poland, Michel Kosinski. He replied, however, that he could not come unless I invited the Minister of Culture in Moscow, Soviet Union, so I also sent him an invitation.

I never thought that anyone from Moscow would come, but imagine my surprise when, on August 8th, all those people invited including a representative from the Ministry of Culture in Moscow, Mr Supagin, arrived.

The meeting took place in the Mayor´s assembly room and was preceded by the famous actor Noël Noël. I was a bit worried about the importance my proposal had assumed, so I asked if anyone would like to be chairman. I got three positive answers; Michel Kosinski from Poland, Maria Sampelayo from Spain and Jim Tatchell from UK.

To my total surprise Mr Supagin stood up and declared: ”All of us in Moscow know the spirit which enthuses you, Henri Coursaget and the festival in Confolens. If you do not agree to be President of this organization, neither the Soviet Union nor the other countries of Eastern Europe will join you”. Nonplussed, Michel Kosinski withdrew and so did Maria Sampelayo and, after a translation Jim Tatchell did the same. In this way the International Council for Folklore Festival Organizations was born, and I became its Founding President. In order to protect the political balance, I proposed Michel Kosinski from Poland as 1st Vice-President and Maria Sampelayo from Spain as 2nd Vice-President.

In 1971, the nominated representatives of 19 countries, gathered at the Hôtel-de-Ville in Confolens on the occasion of the 14th International Folklore Festival in Confolens, confirmed the statutes of their Association founded previous year at the initiative of Mr. Henri Coursaget, President of the Confolens Festival. On July 23, 1975, the Minister of State, Ministry of the Interior of the French Republic, certified the authorization of the foreign association known as: COMITÉ INTERNATIONAL DES ORGANISATIONS DE FESTIVALS DE FOLKLORE C.I.O.F.F. Siège social : Mairie de CONFOLENS

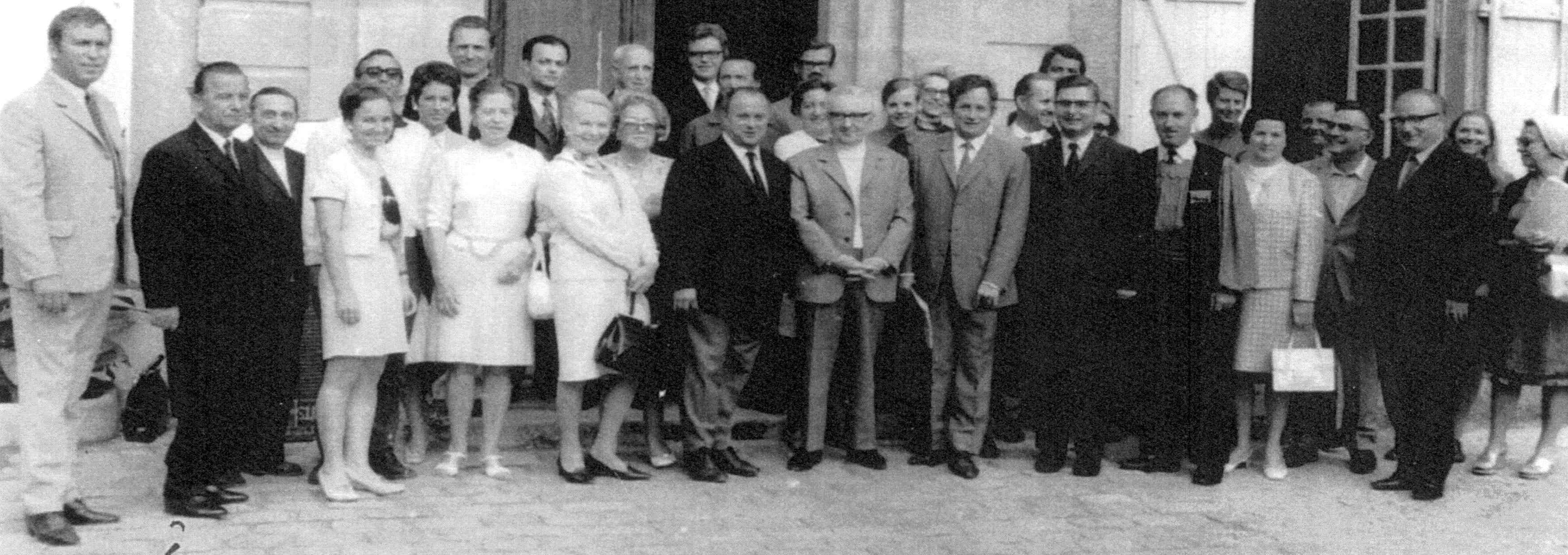
First CIOFF® General Assembly in 1971. Confolens, France

=== CIOFF® Founding Members ===
Belgium - Ms. Fanny Thibout

France - Mr. Henri Coursaget, Mr. Philippe Durizy, Mr. Micheau-Vernez, Mr. François de Laurens-Vastelet

Great Britain- Mr. Jim Tatchell

Hungary - Ms. Acs Miklosne

Netherlands - Mr. Josef Hendriks

Poland - Mr. Michel Kosinski

Portugal- Mr. Joao Moreira

Romania - Mr. Nicolae Pâcurar

U.S.S.R - Mr. Supagin

Switzerland - Mr. Paul Pulh

Yugoslavia - Mr. Bruno Ravnikar

=== Events ===
Each year more than 350 Folklore Festivals organized by CIOFF® members take place worldwide. Every 4 years CIOFF® world organizing the World Folkloriada. This is a major festival where all members of CIOFF® are invited to send Folklore Groups from their countries to show the diversity of Folklore. CIOFF® has organized 5 Folkloriadas.

CIOFF® Folkloriadas
Year	Location	Notes
1996	Brunssum in the Netherlands	
2000	Tokyo and other cities in Japan	
2004	Pécs and Budapest in Hungary	
2008	China	cancelled because of a natural disaster in China
2012	Anseong in South Korea	
2016	Zacatecas in Mexico	
2020	Republic of Bashkortostan, Russia	postponed to 2021 because of the pandemic

=== Culture ===
Two very important aims of CIOFF are to disseminate the ideas of the (Convention on the Protection and Promotion of the Diversity of Cultural Expressions and to collaborate on the implementation of the Convention for the Safeguarding of the Intangible Cultural Heritage of the UNESCO.

=== Formation ===
The organization was founded on August 8, 1970, in Confolence in France by Henri Coursaget und 9 other people.

On July 11, 1984, CIOFF was given the category of mutual informal Relations to UNESCO (Status C). From then on CIOFF became a member of the members of the International Nongovernmental Organizations of UNESCO. In September 1990 CIOFF was upgraded to the category Formal Consultative Relations with UNESCO (Status B).

=== Presidents ===
- Henri Coursaget, France (1970–1989)
- Guy Landry, Canada (1989–1997)
- Kari Bergholm, Finland (1997–2005)
- Dr. Udomsak Sakmunwong, Thailand (2005–2013)
- Philippe Beaussant, France (2013–03/2022 )
- Norbert Müller, Germany (03/2022-09/2022)
- Dr. Alejandro Camacho Gonzalez, Mexico (09/2022-2023)
- Christian Hidalgo-Mazzei, Canada (2023-...)

== Organizational structure ==
=== General Assembly ===
The General Assembly (GA) is the highest organ of CIOFF. It takes place every year in one of the member countries. It is the decision-making unit, because determines of the targets and the formal guidelines of the organization's work and makes decisions on proposals presented by the council. The GA also elects the members of the council for a period of 4 years. The council meets twice a year.

=== General Secretariat ===
The General Secretariat has its headquarters in Stockton on Tees in United Kingdom and is overseen by the Secretary General.

=== Commissions ===
For the development of basic themes in the comprehensive field of activities of CIOFF and for advising the council and the General Assembly permanent Commissions are established. These are the Festivals Commission, the Legal Commission and the Cultural Commission.

=== Committees ===
Committees are established to deal with specific issues.

=== Working groups ===
To solve temporary problems or to do work on specific projects working groups can be established.

=== Management bodies ===
The management bodies of CIOFF are the executive committee (EXCO), consisting of the President, two Vice Presidents, the Treasurer and the Secretary General and the Council consisting of the EXCO, the Chairpersons of the Commissions, the Representatives of the Sectors, the Representative to UNESCO and the Chairperson of the Youth Coordinating Committee.

=== Members ===
African Sector: Algeria, Benin, Botswana, Cameroon, Congo RDC, Central African Republic, Comoros, Egypt, Gabon, Gambia, Guinea Bissau, Guinea Conakry, Ivory Coast, Kenya, Malawi, Mali, Mauritania, Morocco, Senegal, Sierra Leone, South Africa, Uganda, Togo, Tunisia, Zambia, Zimbabwe

Asian and the Pacific Sector: Bangladesh, China, Chinese Taipei, India, Indonesia, Iran, Japan, Jordan Kingdom, Rep. of Korea, Kuwait, Kyrgyzstan, Malaysia, Nepal, New Zealand, Pakistan, Palestine, Philippines, Qatar, Saudi Arabia, Syria, Tahiti, Thailand, Timor Leste, Turkey, United Arab Emirates (UAE), Uzbekistan.

Central and North European Sector: Armenia, Austria, Belarus, Belgium, Czech Republic, Estonia, Finland, Georgia, Germany, Hungary, Ireland, Israel, Latvia, Lithuania, Luxembourg, Netherlands, Norway, Poland, Romania, Russia, Slovenia, Ukraine, United Kingdom (Currently Belarus and Russia are suspended)

Latin American and Caribbean Sector: Argentina, Bolivia, Brazil, Chile, Colombia, Costa Rica, Cuba, Ecuador, El Salvador, Guatemala, Mexico, Panama, Paraguay, Peru, Puerto Rico, Venezuela

North American Sector: Canada, United States of America, St. Vincent and the Grenadines

South European Sector: Albania, Bosnia-Herzegovina, Bulgaria, Croatia, Cyprus, Cyprus Northern Part, France, Greece, Italy, Kosovo, Montenegro, North Macedonia, Portugal, Serbia, Spain, Switzerland,
