= Museum of Comparative Zoology =

Natural history museum at Harvard University

Coordinates: 42°22′42.50″N 71°06′56.00″W

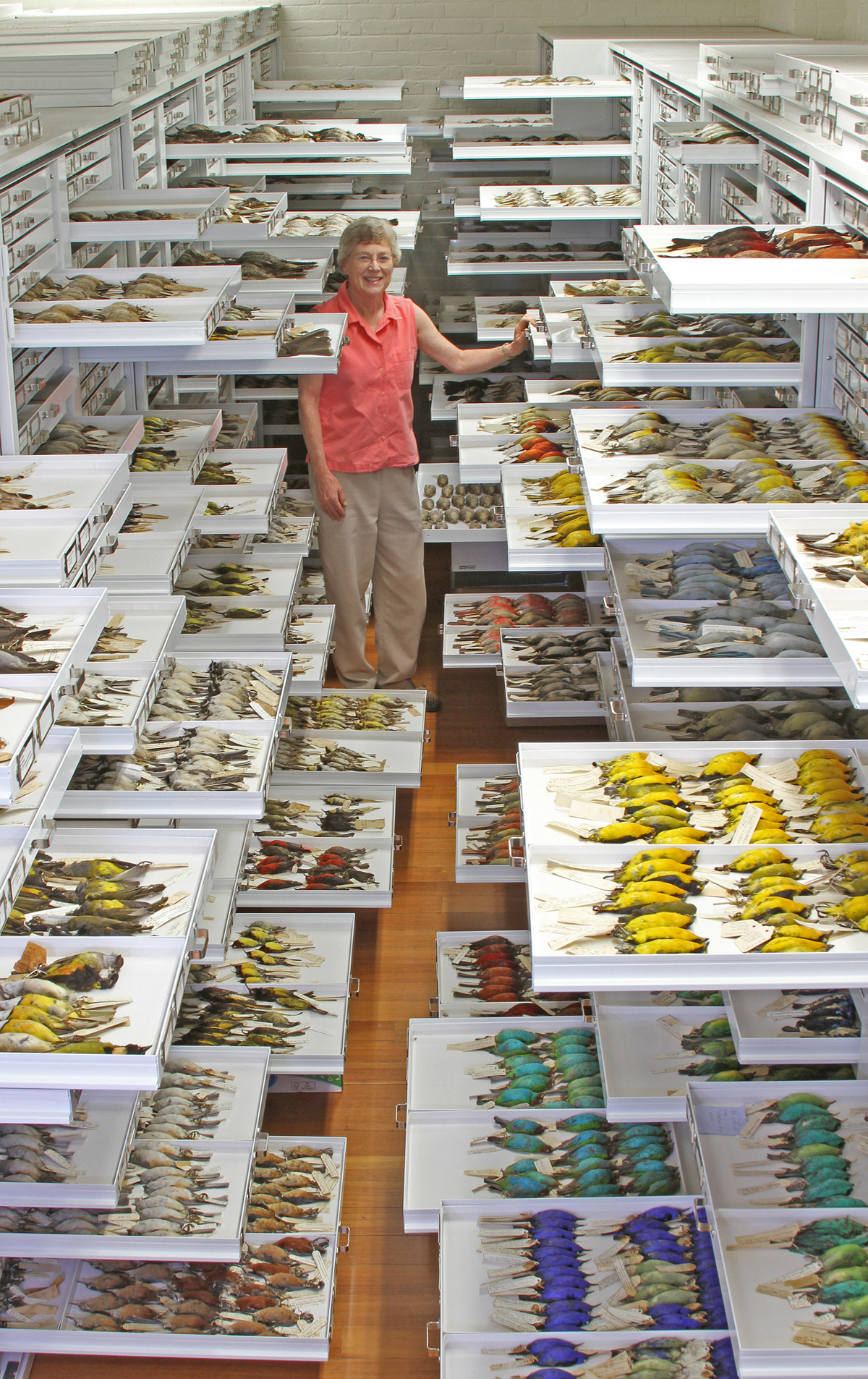
A collection of bird specimens at the Museum of Comparative Zoology

The Museum of Comparative Zoology (formally the Agassiz Museum of Comparative Zoology and often abbreviated to MCZ) is a zoology museum located on the grounds of Harvard University in Cambridge, Massachusetts. It is one of three natural-history research museums at Harvard, whose public face is the Harvard Museum of Natural History.

Harvard MCZ's collections consist of some 21 million specimens, of which several thousand are on rotating public display. While the research collections of the MCZ are not open to the public, the museum maintains MCZbase, a public database of its zoological collections.

Many of the exhibits in the public museum have not only zoological interest, but also historical significance. Past exhibits have featured a fossil sand dollar collected by Charles Darwin in 1834, a mamo collected by Captain James Cook, and two golden pheasants that once belonged to George Washington.

Gonzalo Giribet, Alexander Agassiz Professor of Zoology at Harvard and Curator of Invertebrate Zoology, has served as the museum's director since 2021.

== History ==
The Museum of Comparative Zoology was founded in 1859 through the efforts of zoologist Louis Agassiz; the museum used to be referred to as "The Agassiz" after its founder. Agassiz designed the collection to illustrate the variety and comparative relationships of animal life. According to Goodale, "What he had in mind, as indicated by hints in his reports and other communications, was a museum for research and illustration in all departments of what was then called natural history. It was intended to comprise everything from minerals, through the kingdom of plants, to the highest animals. It was to include also man regarded from an archaeological and ethnological point of view." Alexander Agassiz was his father's assistant until 1875 when Alexander became curator. Alexander Agassiz served for 23 years as curator, 10 as director of the Museum of Comparative Zoology, and from 1902, until his death, as director of the University Museum, comprising all the sections. His gifts to the museum and to other departments of Harvard University considerably exceeded a million dollars.

Many female paleontologists, such as Elvira Wood, were involved in the early development of the museum.

The Radcliffe Zoological Laboratory was created in 1894 when Radcliffe College rented a space on the fifth floor of the MCZ to convert into a women's laboratory. Prior to this acquisition, Radcliffe science laboratories were taught using inadequate facilities, converting spaces such as bathrooms in old houses into physics laboratories, in which Harvard professors often refused to teach. The laboratory space was converted from an office or storage closet, and was sandwiched between other invertebrate storage rooms on the fifth floor.

== Departments ==
The museum has nine departments with research collections: Entomology, Herpetology, Ichthyology, Invertebrate Paleontology, Invertebrate Zoology, Mammalogy, Malacology, Ornithology, and Vertebrate Paleontology. The Ernst Mayr Library and its archives form the tenth department of the museum. The library is a founding member of the Biodiversity Heritage Library.

== Publications ==
The museum publishes two journals: the Bulletin of the Museum of Comparative Zoology at Harvard College, first published in 1869, and Breviora, first published in 1956.

== Displays ==
In contrast to numerous more modern museums, the Harvard Museum of Natural History has many hundreds of taxidermy animals on display, from the MCZ collections. Notable exhibits include whale skeletons, the largest turtle shell ever found (8 ft long), "the Harvard mastodon", a 42-foot (13 m) long Kronosaurus skeleton, the skeleton of a dodo, and a coelacanth preserved in fluid. The two-story Great Mammal Hall was renovated in 2009 in celebration of the 150th anniversary of founding of the museum.

Changing exhibitions at the museum have included "Evolution" (2008); "The Language of Color" (2008 to 2013); "Arthropods: Creatures that Rule" (2006); "New England Forests" (2011); and "Mollusks: Shelled Masters of the Marine Realm" (2012).

=== Gallery ===
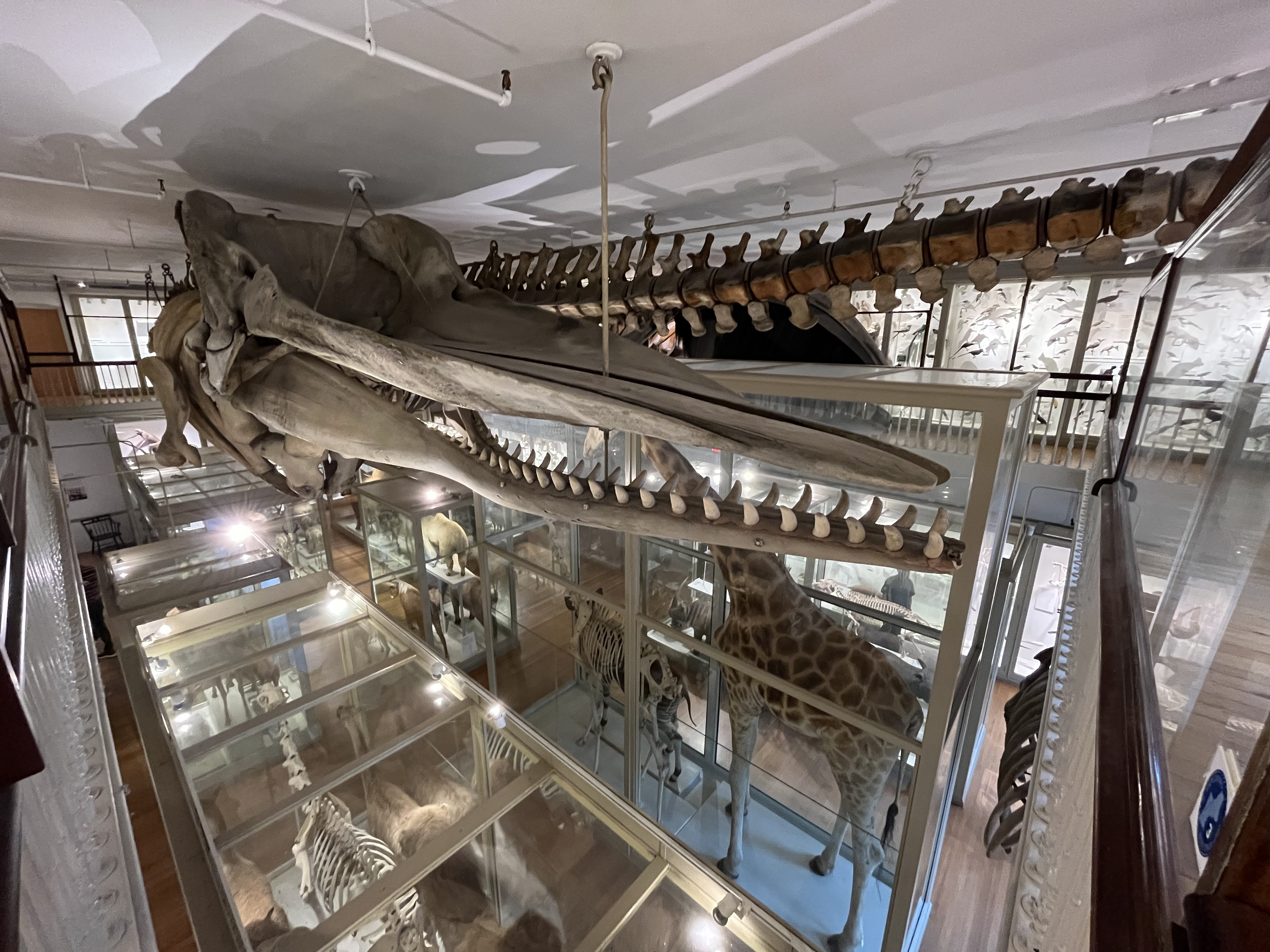

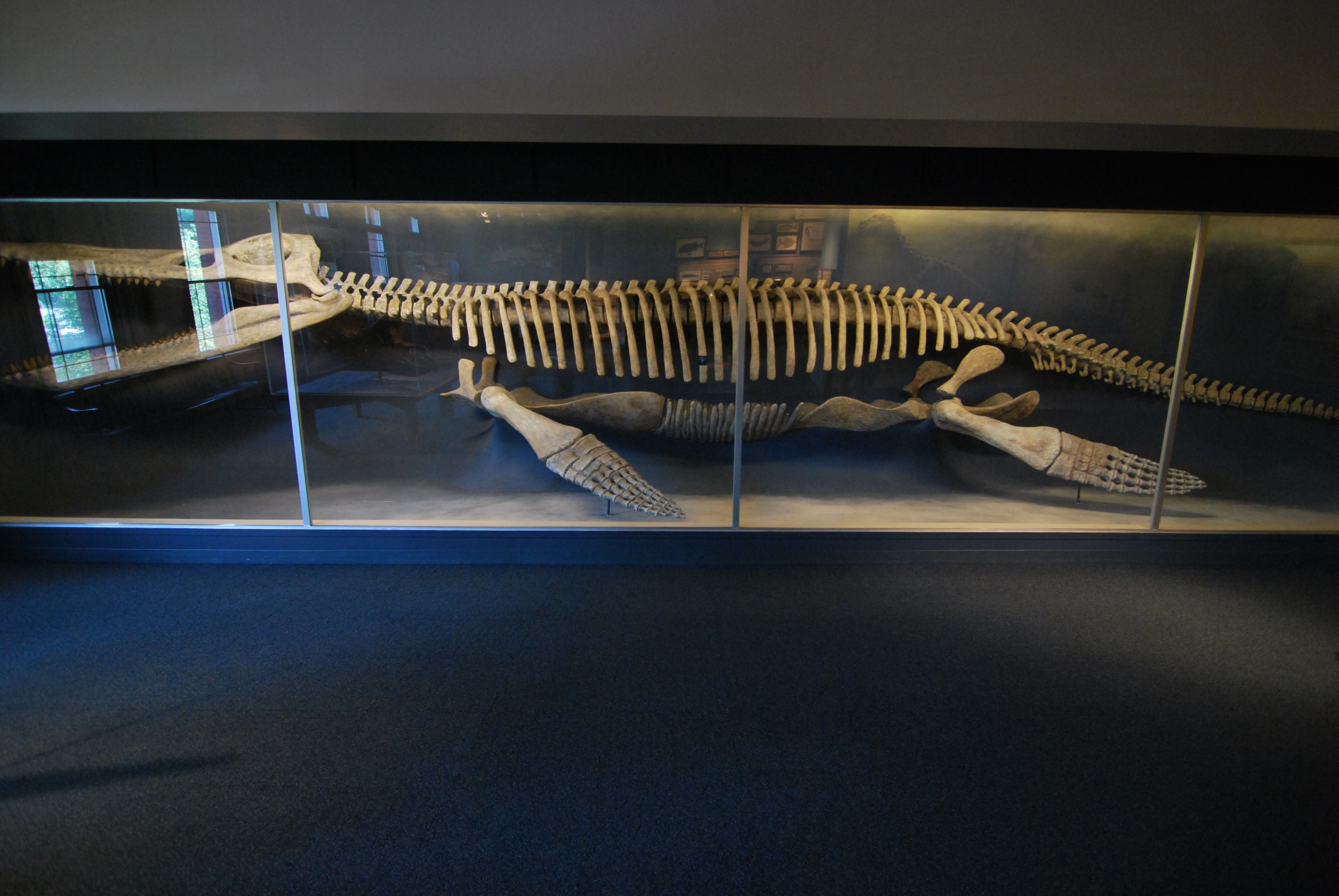

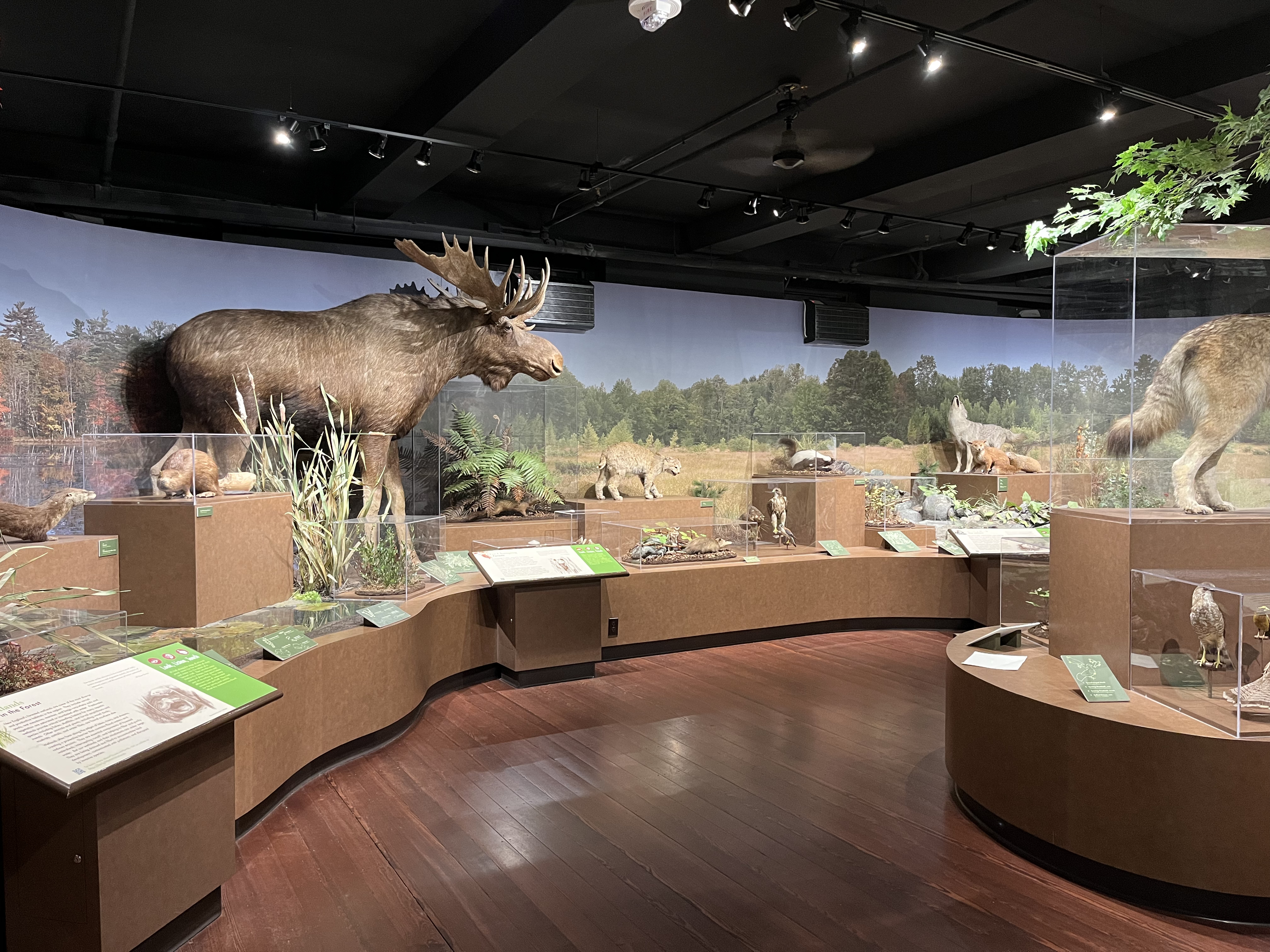

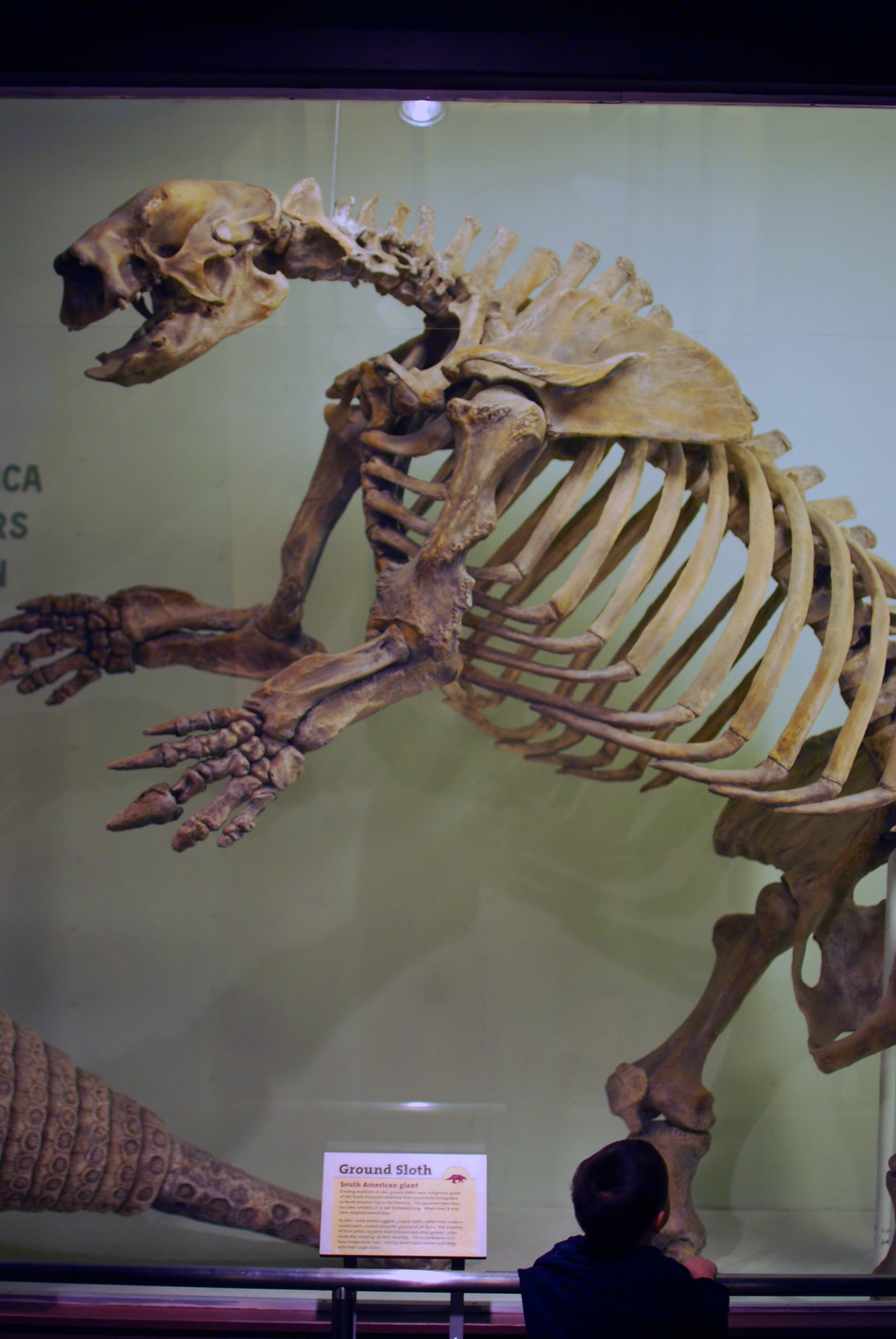

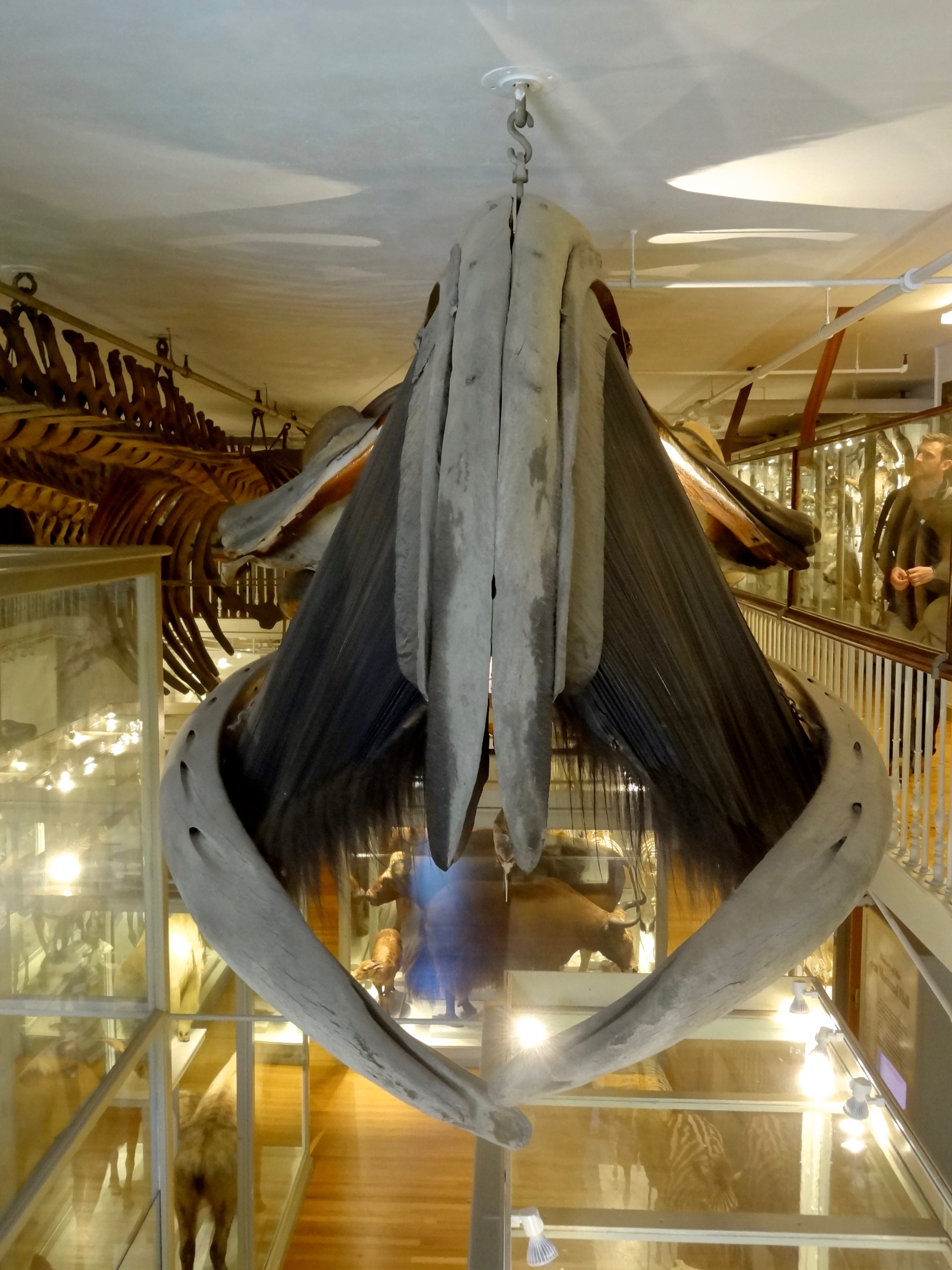
