= Woodbourne, New Zealand =

Settlement in Marlborough, New Zealand

Woodbourne
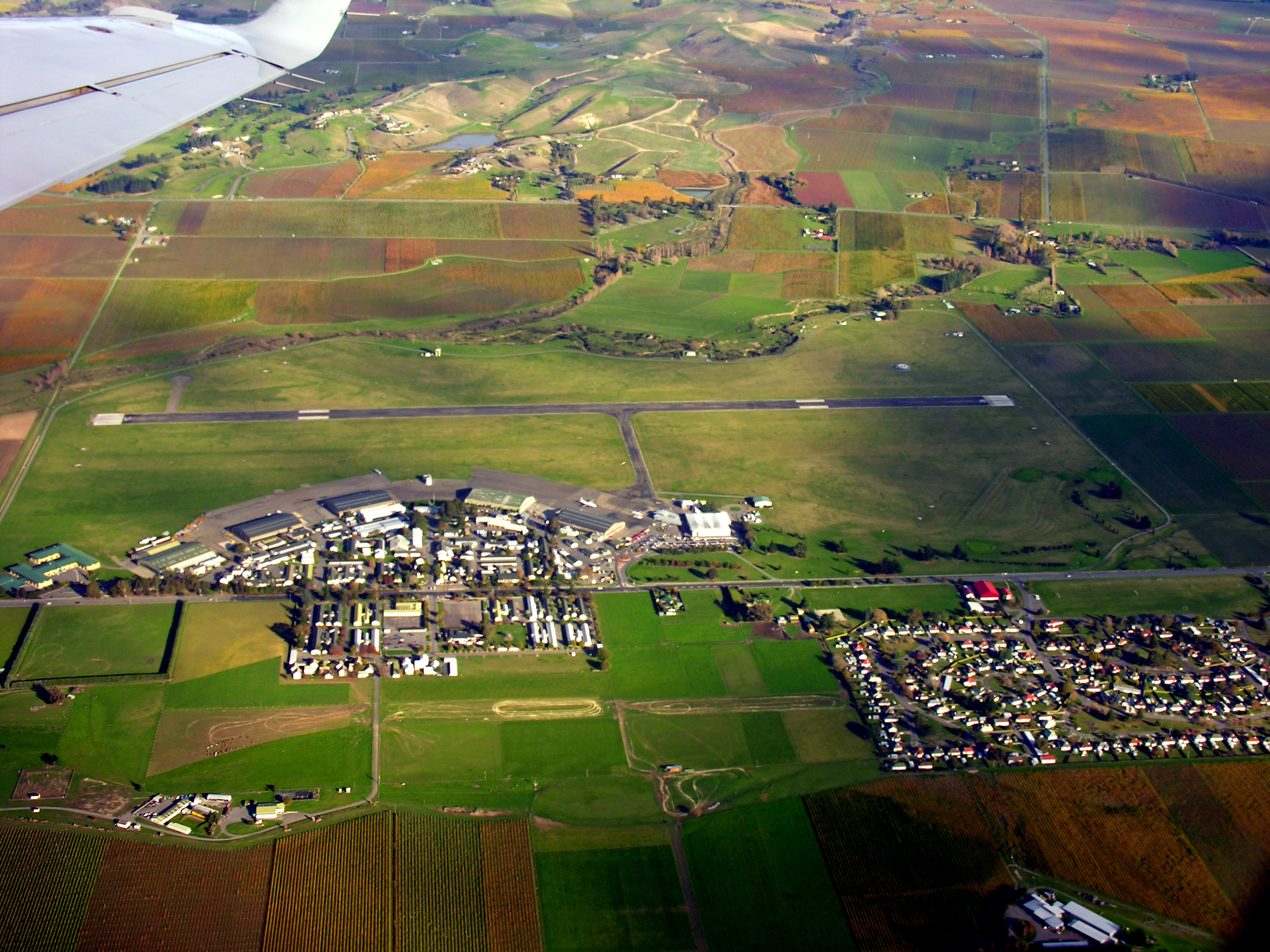
- Woodbourne, with the airport and base in the middle and the settlement at the lower right
- Interactive map of Woodbourne
- Coordinates: 41.510°S 173.864°E
- Country: New Zealand
- Region: Marlborough
- Ward: Wairau-Awatere General Ward; Marlborough Māori Ward
- Electorates: Kaikōura; Te Tai Tonga (Māori)

Government
  - Territorial Authority: Marlborough District Council
  - Marlborough District Mayor: Nadine Taylor
  - Kaikōura MP: Stuart Smith
  - Te Tai Tonga MP: Tākuta Ferris

Area
  - Total: 3.79 km^{2} (1.46 sq mi)

Population (June 2025)
  - Total: 520
  - Density: 140/km^{2} (360/sq mi)

Woodbourne is a rural settlement in Marlborough, New Zealand. It is located on State Highway 6, 8 kilometres (5 mi) west of Blenheim, and 4 km (2 mi) east of Renwick. Woodbourne Airport is the major airport for Marlborough, and RNZAF Base Woodbourne shares the airport's runways.

== Historic building ==
Woodbourne Homestead is a large timber house built in the early 1850s by sheep farmer Henry Godfrey. In 2010, it was listed as a Historic Place Category 1 according to Heritage New Zealand.

== Demographics ==
Woodbourne is described by Stats NZ as a rural settlement which covers 3.79 km^{2} (1.46 sq mi). It had an estimated population of 520 as of June 2025, with a population density of 137 people per km^{2}. It is part of the Woodbourne statistical area.

Historical population for Woodbourne settlement
Year	Pop.	±% p.a.
2006	675	—
2013	402	−7.14%
2018	582	+7.68%
2023	507	−2.72%

Woodbourne settlement had a population of 507 in the 2023 New Zealand census, a decrease of 75 people (−12.9%) since the 2018 census, and an increase of 105 people (26.1%) since the 2013 census. There were 291 males, 213 females, and 3 people of other genders in 162 dwellings. 4.7% of people identified as LGBTIQ+. The median age was 26.4 years (compared with 38.1 years nationally). There were 105 people (20.7%) aged under 15 years, 195 (38.5%) aged 15 to 29, 186 (36.7%) aged 30 to 64, and 24 (4.7%) aged 65 or older.

People could identify as more than one ethnicity. The results were 82.8% European (Pākehā); 16.0% Māori; 4.1% Pasifika; 9.5% Asian; 0.6% Middle Eastern, Latin American and African New Zealanders (MELAA); and 2.4% other, which includes people giving their ethnicity as "New Zealander". English was spoken by 97.0%, Māori by 2.4%, Samoan by 0.6%, and other languages by 11.2%. No language could be spoken by 3.0% (e.g. too young to talk). New Zealand Sign Language was known by 0.6%. The percentage of people born overseas was 16.6, compared with 28.8% nationally.

Religious affiliations were 21.3% Christian, 1.2% Hindu, 1.2% Islam, 0.6% Māori religious beliefs, 2.4% Buddhist, 0.6% Jewish, and 2.4% other religions. People who answered that they had no religion were 62.7%, and 6.5% of people did not answer the census question.

Of those at least 15 years old, 66 (16.4%) people had a bachelor's or higher degree, 273 (67.9%) had a post-high school certificate or diploma, and 60 (14.9%) people exclusively held high school qualifications. The median income was $53,800, compared with $41,500 nationally. 27 people (6.7%) earned over $100,000 compared to 12.1% nationally. The employment status of those at least 15 was 294 (73.1%) full-time, 42 (10.4%) part-time, and 9 (2.2%) unemployed.

=== Woodbourne statistical area ===
The statistical area, which also includes Marlborough Ridge and Fairhall, covers 76.13 km^{2} (29.39 sq mi). It had an estimated population of 1,820 as of June 2025, with a population density of 24 people per km^{2}.

Historical population for the statistical area
Year	Pop.	±% p.a.
2006	1,914	—
2013	1,425	−4.13%
2018	1,743	+4.11%
2023	1,749	+0.07%
The 2006 population is for a larger area of 80.15 km^{2}. Source:

Woodbourne statistical area had a population of 1,749 in the 2023 New Zealand census, an increase of 6 people (0.3%) since the 2018 census, and an increase of 324 people (22.7%) since the 2013 census. There were 909 males, 837 females, and 3 people of other genders in 636 dwellings. 2.9% of people identified as LGBTIQ+. The median age was 40.2 years (compared with 38.1 years nationally). There were 318 people (18.2%) aged under 15 years, 351 (20.1%) aged 15 to 29, 744 (42.5%) aged 30 to 64, and 336 (19.2%) aged 65 or older.

People could identify as more than one ethnicity. The results were 90.4% European (Pākehā); 11.8% Māori; 2.2% Pasifika; 4.6% Asian; 0.9% Middle Eastern, Latin American and African New Zealanders (MELAA); and 2.7% other, which includes people giving their ethnicity as "New Zealander". English was spoken by 98.1%, Māori by 1.9%, Samoan by 0.2%, and other languages by 8.1%. No language could be spoken by 1.4% (e.g. too young to talk). New Zealand Sign Language was known by 0.3%. The percentage of people born overseas was 18.4, compared with 28.8% nationally.

Religious affiliations were 29.3% Christian, 0.5% Hindu, 0.5% Islam, 0.2% Māori religious beliefs, 1.2% Buddhist, 0.2% New Age, 0.2% Jewish, and 1.2% other religions. People who answered that they had no religion were 59.3%, and 7.2% of people did not answer the census question.

Of those at least 15 years old, 408 (28.5%) people had a bachelor's or higher degree, 774 (54.1%) had a post-high school certificate or diploma, and 240 (16.8%) people exclusively held high school qualifications. The median income was $53,100, compared with $41,500 nationally. 261 people (18.2%) earned over $100,000 compared to 12.1% nationally. The employment status of those at least 15 was 816 (57.0%) full-time, 246 (17.2%) part-time, and 18 (1.3%) unemployed.

== Notable people ==
- Fanny Arden (née Godfrey), painter, daughter of Henry Godfrey.
