= Fanny Loy =

Argentine actress, dancer and singer

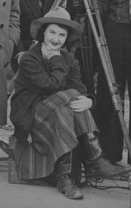

Background information
- Birth name: Anita Fanny Luchi
- Born: 25 September 1917; Cañada de Gómez, Argentina
- Origin: Argentine
- Occupation(s): Singer, dancer

Fanny Loy (born Anita Fanny Luchi 25 September 1917 – unknown) was an Argentine actress, dancer and singer from the beginning of the 20th century.

== Career ==
Loy started as actress and radio singer after winning a contest organised by the magazine The Modern Song (later called Radiolandia).

She debuted in a film titled The woman and the jungle from 1941, with figures of the Argentine scene like Néstor Deval, Hilda Lámar, Carlos Perelli, Tomás Cabral, José Puricell and José Piumatto.

She was a friend of the director José Agustín Ferreyra, who introduced figures like Lidia Liss and María Turgenova.

In the theatre, she worked with actors like Fernando Ochoa, Alicia Vignoli, Olinda Bozán, Pablo Palitos, Alberto Anchart, Juan Bernabé Ferreyra, Chas of Cruz, Oscar Villa, Miguel Caló, Ángel Vargas, Aída Alberti, Floren Delbene, Roberto White, Agustín Irusta and Ignacio Corsini.

=== Stage singer ===
She was a singer of the tango beside the others like Libertad Lamarque, Tita Merello, Mercedes Simone, Gilds Davis, Tania, Sofia Bozán, Nelly Omar, Azucena Maizani, Ada Falcón, and Carmen Duval.

She worked with Anibal Troilo to compose the Milonga triste, forming a vocal quintet together with the Hernández sisters, Carlos Videl and Héctor Vargas, giving a new sound to the interpretation of Pichuco of the beautiful work of Piana and Manzi.

She stood out as a radio singer for Radio Belgrano together with other singers like Virginia Vera, Betty Caruso and Sponsorship Díaz, and musicians like Manuel Sucher and Hernán Oliva. In this program which debuted in December 1934, in a program sponsored by Productos Griet, one of her companions was the bandleader Mario Demarcate. Afterwards she went to Radio El Mundo where she starred in the radio program The Soul That Sings with Francisco Lomuto, Adhelma Falcón and Mercedes Carné. Eight months afterwards, she was in Radius Prieto where acted until the end of 1937. In Municipal Radio, she worked with personalities like Julia of Alba, Evita Lauri, Osvaldo Moreno, Chola Vétere, Carmen Duval, and the sisters Lidia Desmond and Violeta Desmond.

In 1940, she toured the cities of Brazil that culminated in the Municipal Theatre of Rio de Janeiro.

She composed some works like Resignation, Tango humorous, Mañanita of field and Ay nenita kiss me.

=== Private life ===
Loy was the wife of Argentine dancer Domingo Gaeta. Gaeta was a dance teacher.
