= Fanny Arden =

New Zealand artist

- Born: Fanny Eliza Godfrey circa 1859
- Died: 13 June 1955 (aged 95–96)
- Resting place: Hurdon Cemetery, New Plymouth, New Zealand
- Spouse: Francis Hamar Arden
- Children: Henry Neville, Phyllis Godfrey, Frances Jean

Fanny Eliza Arden (née Godfrey; c. 1859 – 13 June 1955) was a New Zealand artist.

== Biography ==
Fanny Eliza Arden was born circa 1859 to Henry Godfrey of Woodbourne, who died when she was a teenager. She became the second wife of New Zealand artist, Francis Hamar Arden on 7 September 1887. Together they had three children: Captain Henry Neville (5 January 1889 – 4 October 1917), Phyllis Godfrey (1892) and Frances Jean (1895). Her husband died by 19 December 1899. Her eldest child was killed in action at the Battle of Broodseinde during the First World War.

She was taught to paint by her husband, and many of her paintings were donated to the Govett-Brewster Art Gallery. Several of her paintings now are in Puke Ariki and the Auckland Art Gallery. In January 2020, her watercolour, Mt Egmont, sold for NZ$425 at Dunbar Sloane Wellington.

Arden died on 13 June 1955. She was buried at Hurdon Cemetery in New Plymouth.
