= Fanny Good =

New Zealand artist (1860–1950)

- Born: 1860; Omata, New Zealand
- Died: 15 December 1950 (aged 90); New Plymouth, New Zealand
- Occupation(s): Painter; Botanical illustrator

Fanny Bertha Good (1860 – 15 December 1950) was an artist in colonial New Zealand, noted for her paintings of native New Zealand botanical specimens. She took up painting as a teenager when an illness caused her to become deaf.

== Life ==
Fanny Bertha Good was born in Omata, in the Taranaki region of New Zealand in 1860. Her father, Captain Thomas Good, was an early settler in the area. At the age of 17, she contracted measles and became deaf. Taught by her father, she took up painting. Good executed many artworks of native flowers and fungi that she collected from the bush in Ōeo, where she lived with her parents, and later in Hāwera, where she subsequently resided. She worked primarily in oils and her paintings are noted for being more colourful than traditional depictions of botanical specimens.

In February 1935, Good donated over 200 of her paintings to the New Plymouth Museum. In her later years, her sight declined, and this was attributed to the strain of her painting work. She died on 15 December 1950 at New Plymouth Hospital, at the age of 90. At the time of her death, an exhibition of her works was on display at the New Plymouth Museum.

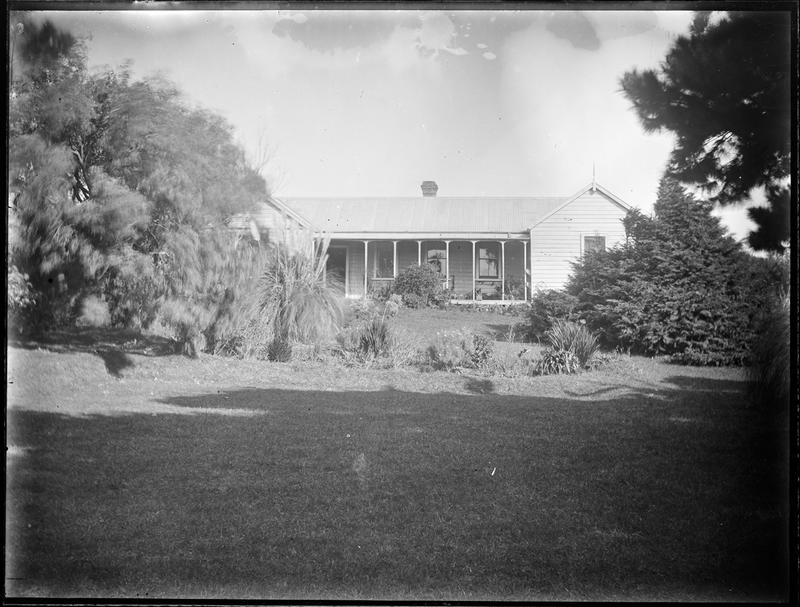
The Good family homestead at Ōeo, where Fanny Good spent her childhood

An exhibition of Good's work, titled "State of Nature: Picturing the Silent Forest", was held at Puke Ariki, the renamed New Plymouth Museum, from April to November 2023. It was the first time that many of her paintings had been publicly shown. A member of the Good family, Sarah Good, executed some complementary artworks for display alongside her relative's paintings.
