= Fanny Calder =

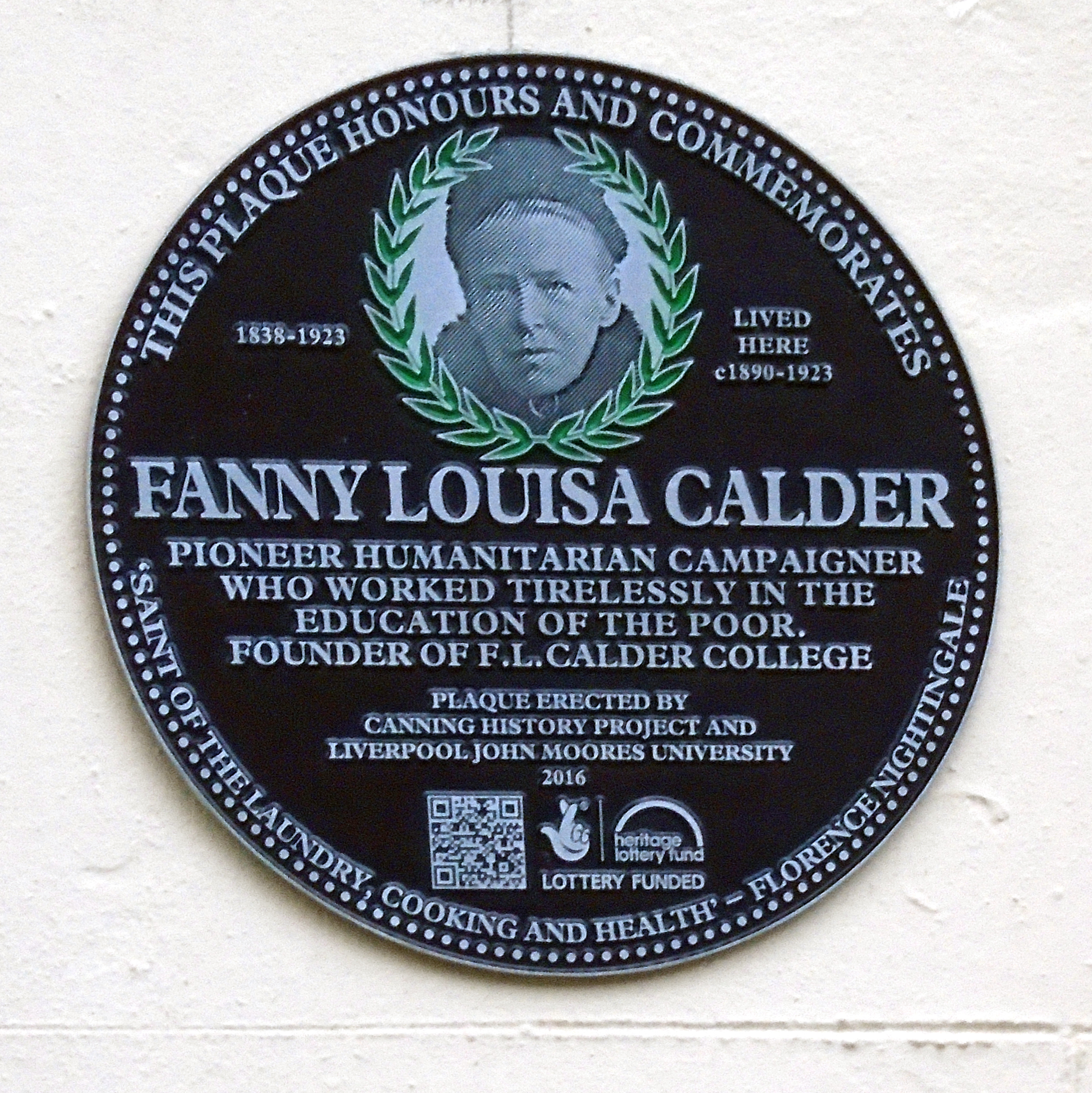
- Plaque in Canning Street, Liverpool
- Born: 26 March 1838; Liverpool, England
- Died: 6 June 1923 (aged 85); Liverpool
- Writing career
- Subject: Domestic Science

Fanny Louise Calder (26 March 1838 – 6 June 1923) was a promoter of education in domestic subjects in Liverpool, England. The college that she created would in time become part of Liverpool John Moores University.

== Life ==
Calder was born in Liverpool in 1838 to James and Jane Calder. Her father bought and sold cotton, and he had lived in America for some years. She was the youngest of eleven and was a dedicated Anglican, attending Sunday school and other church activities. She became concerned for the state of the poor.

In 1875, she started a "Ladies Committee" with herself as secretary that would organise the Liverpool School of Domestic Science. The committee included the Countess of Sefton and Mary Stanley, Countess of Derby. The classes were originally held at St George's Hall in central Liverpool. The following year, she established the "Northern Union of Training Schools of Cookery" which included schools in Yorkshire, Edinburgh and Glasgow. It was this body that issued certification for the courses. In 1891 she published "A Teachers' Manual of Elementary Laundry Work".

In 1900, the organisation moved to new buildings at Colquitt Street, where term started on 2 September.

During the First World War, the school remained popular but the unavailability of some items meant that courses had to be mothballed. On the other hand she was called on to teach cookery to soldiers.

== Death and legacy ==
The Domestic Science College ran out of funds in 1920 and had to apply for increased funding from the Local Education Authority. These negotiations ended with the college being incorporated into the LEA. The school was renamed the F. L. Calder College of Domestic Science.

Calder died in Liverpool in 1923. The college that she created would in time become part of Liverpool John Moores University. Calder's house carries two plaques, one with a quote from Florence Nightingale. Nightingale wrote to her and described her as "Saint of the laundry, cooking and health".
