= Fanny Hertz =

British educationalist and feminist

- Born: Fanny Hertz; 1830; Hanover, Germany
- Died: 31 March 1908 (aged 77–78); London, United Kingdom
- Occupation: Educationalist
- Notable work: Mechanics' Institutes for working women, with special reference to the manufacturing districts of Yorkshire
- Spouse: William Hertz
- Children: 3

Fanny Hertz (1830 – 31 March 1908) was a British educationalist and feminist who worked to establish and promote various institutions for female education in Bradford.

== Early life ==
Hertz was born in Hanover in Germany to diamond merchant Bram Hertz. She counted herself a descendant of Heinrich Hertz. She moved to London in 1837, and lived in both London and Bradford during that decade. She married her cousin, mill owner and yarn merchant William David Hertz at St James's Church, Westminster in 1851, with whom she had three children. Their Bradford home served as a meeting place for artists, thinkers and radicals. She met and befriended Frederic Harrison. Through Harrison and her circle of associates in Bradford, Hertz embraced the philosophy of positivism.

== Women's education ==
Hertz was a proponent of women's education, in particular for working-class women who were not eligible to study in Mechanics' Institutes. She was associated with the Huddersfield Female Educational Institute, founded in 1847. In 1857, she helped to establish a similar institute in Bradford, serving on its committee. She founded Bradford Ladies' Educational Association in 1868, which raised funds to found Bradford Girls' Grammar School with the support of local Liberal MP William Edward Forster, husband of her Bradford Ladies Educational Association associate Jane Forster.

When the National Association for the Promotion of Social Science held its 1859 congress in Bradford, Hertz presented a paper called Mechanics' Institutes for working women, with special reference to the manufacturing districts of Yorkshire in which she accepted reading, writing, arithmetic, and needlework as a core for female education, she rejected that education should be designed to prepare women "for the duties of wives and mothers, of mistresses and servants". She advocated for a broader curriculum influenced by Johann Heinrich Perstalozzi's theories of education.

She served on the North of England Council for Promoting the Higher Education of Women and Maria Grey's National Union for Improving the Education of Women of All Classes.

== Later life ==
Hertz moved to Harley Street in London in the 1870s, where she received guests with interests in radical causes at her salon including Robert Browning and Henry James. In 1876, she published a translation of a chapter from Auguste Comte's System of Positive Polity. Her husband died in 1880, whilst Hertz herself died in 1908 in her Lansdowne Crescent home.
