= Fanny Rush =

British painter

Fanny Rush is a London-based portrait painter, best known for her portrait of US Ambassador Robert Tuttle for the American Embassy, London 2015.

== Biography ==
Based in Chelsea, London, Fanny Rush is a portrait painter, the daughter of two artists, Peter Rush and Caroline Lucas and also sister of the sculptor Joe Rush. She is the granddaughter of the author Mary Norton best known for the children's classics Bedknobs and Broomsticks and The Borrowers.

== Portraits ==
Rush has painted portraits of:

- Ambassador Robert Holmes Tuttle, US Ambassador to the UK. This portrait hangs at The American Embassy, London.
- Sir William Castell, Chairman of The Wellcome Trust, Executive Director of B.P. and of General Electric, USA. This portrait hangs at The Wellcome Trust, London.
- Sir Paul Nurse, Nobel Laureate former President of Rockefeller University New York, former President of the Royal Society London and Chief Executive and Director of the Francis Crick Institute London.
- Sir Michael Dixon, Chairman of the Natural History Museum, London.
- John Studzinski CBE, Senior Managing Director and Global Head of Blackstone Group, New York.
- Sunil Mittal, founder Chairman and Managing Director of Bharti Airtel Group, India.
- Mervyn Davies, Baron Davies of Abersoch CBE, formerly UK Trade Minister and Chairman of Standard Chartered Bank.
- Sharad Pawar, Minister for Agriculture, India, and President of the International Cricket Council.
- Oliver Stocken CBE, Chairman of Marylebone Cricket Club and of the Natural History Museum, London.
- Kevin Ching C.E.O. of Sotheby's Asia, Hong Kong.
- Shane Warne (2005), commissioned by Marylebone Cricket Club for the Long Room at Lord's Cricket Ground, London. There was some controversy at the time of the unveiling because Rush omitted Warne's signature diamond earrings that he always wore during matches because she didn't want them to detract from the cricket ball in the painting.
- Charles Dance, Actor.
- Michael Buerk, British journalist and newsreader.
- David Cull, British tennis player.

== Publications ==
Published works include Painting the light by Fanny Rush, The Artist Magazine February 2015 and The Patience of Ordinary Things, published by Phaidon Press.

== Sources ==
- Shane Warne: The UK based artists chose Warne fo. Ww.itimes.com (2010-04-01). Retrieved on 2014-01-22.
- Photographer's Eye: Frank Herholdt. Imagesource.com. Retrieved on 2014-01-22.
- http://fannyrush.com/webcms/wp-content/uploads/2013/11/fanny_rush_catalogue_2013.pdf
