= Fanny Thibout =

Belgian dancer and folklorist (1907–1998)

- Born: 1907; Liège, Wallonia, Belgium
- Died: 1998 (aged 90–91)
- Occupations: Dancer, choreographer and folklorist

Fanny Thibout (1907–1998) was a Belgian dancer, choreographer and folklorist. She was known as the "grand dame" of Walloon folk dance for her work reviving the dance culture. She founded the International Federation of Folk Groups and the International Confederation of Folk Festivals and was one of the founder members of the International Council of Organizations of Folklore Festivals and Folk Arts (CIOFF®).

== Biography ==
Thibout was born in 1907 in Liège, Wallonia, Belgium. She studied and learned dance in her hometown.

Thibout performed as a folk dancer. In the 1930s, she gave classes in "bodily expression" and rhythm. She visited villages in the Ardennes region to collect folk music and dances from village elders, including allemandes, arèdje [fr], maclotes [fr] (dances that sailors performed on boats for entertainment), mazurkas, quadrilles, passepieds, polkas and polonaises. This led to the formation of her own dance company in 1936, to showcase traditional dances from the region and to organise folklore galas, in collaboration with an a cappella choir.

After World War II, the a cappella choir and folk dance groups separated and the "Fanny Thibout Company" was formed. The company was recognized by the French Ministry of National Education in 1953.

Thibout became known as the "grand dame" of Walloon folk dance for her work reviving the dance culture of the region. She also choreographed and toured internationally to showcase folk dancing, including in the Bahamas, Canada, the Canary Islands, England, France, Greece, Italy, Japan, Portugal, Spain, Switzerland and the United States.

Thibout founded the International Federation of Folk Groups and the International Confederation of Folk Festivals. In 1950, she gave a solo recital at Les Archives Internationales de la Danse in Paris, France.

Thibout was a member of the Walloon section of the Royal Belgian Folklore Commission and was an founding member of the nongovernmental organization (NGO) International Council of Organizations of Folklore Festivals and Folk Arts (CIOFF®). She was the delegate of the CIOFF® to a seminar, which was on the topic of the "Presentation and Dissemination of Folklore in the Contemporary World," delivered to a meeting of the UNESCO International Music Council in Bourgas, Bulgaria, in 1979.

Thibout died in 1998, aged 91.

In 2006, the book Fanny Thibout... Son folklore... Ses amis (Fanny Thibout... Her Folklore... Her Friends) by Joseph Bonfond was published.
