= Fanny Furner =

Australian suffragist

Fanny Furner (1864–1938) was an activist who worked to further the rights of women and children in the early 1900s in Sydney.

== Accomplishments ==
Fanny Furner was one of the first female JPs in New South Wales and along with fellow member of the Theosophical Society, Mrs AV Roberts, the first women to stand for election in local government – Mrs Roberts in North Shore, Fanny in Manly.

Furner was instrumental in setting up a Memorial at the gates at the Wharves in Woolloomooloo to commemorate the place from where most of the men embarked for the First World War. She also helped organise the first children's playground in Gilbert Park, Manly. Furner was responsible for the Home Mission Society bins being placed at the Manly Wharves.

== Media Attention ==
Furner had many articles in The Manly Daily on civic and social matters and was friendly with the editor and owner. However the paper was burnt out in 1959 and there are no copies at the State Library held before that date.

== Legacy ==
References to Fanny Furner and her accomplishments continue to surface. On 19 September 1987, an article appeared in the Manly Daily newspaper, stating:

Fanny Set Precedent. Next week eight women will seek election, following a precedent set 65 years ago when Fanny Furner announced her candidature as the first woman to stand for Manly Council. She was unsuccessful but pleaded the cause of a female voice to be heard on the council. Fanny believed women should have a say in municipal affairs relating to public health, housing, pure foods, roads, sanitation and liquor laws, amusements and children's interests."

This article, published long after Furner's death demonstrates the longevity of her suffrage work.
