= Fanny Langdon =

American zoologist (1864–1899)

Fanny Elizabeth Langdon (15 July 1864 – 21 October 1899) was an American zoologist known for her work with invertebrate sensory organs and nervous systems. Langdon was born in Plymouth, New Hampshire and attended a normal school, teaching for three years in New Hampshire before pursuing undergraduate studies in zoology and botany at the University of Michigan in 1891. She earned her bachelor's degree in 1896 and her master's degree in 1897. After earning her degrees, she became an instructor in botany and zoology at the University of Michigan, and researched at the Marine Biological Laboratory in Woods Hole, Massachusetts in 1897. Langdon died after appendicitis surgery.
