= Culverden =

Town in Canterbury, New Zealand

- town
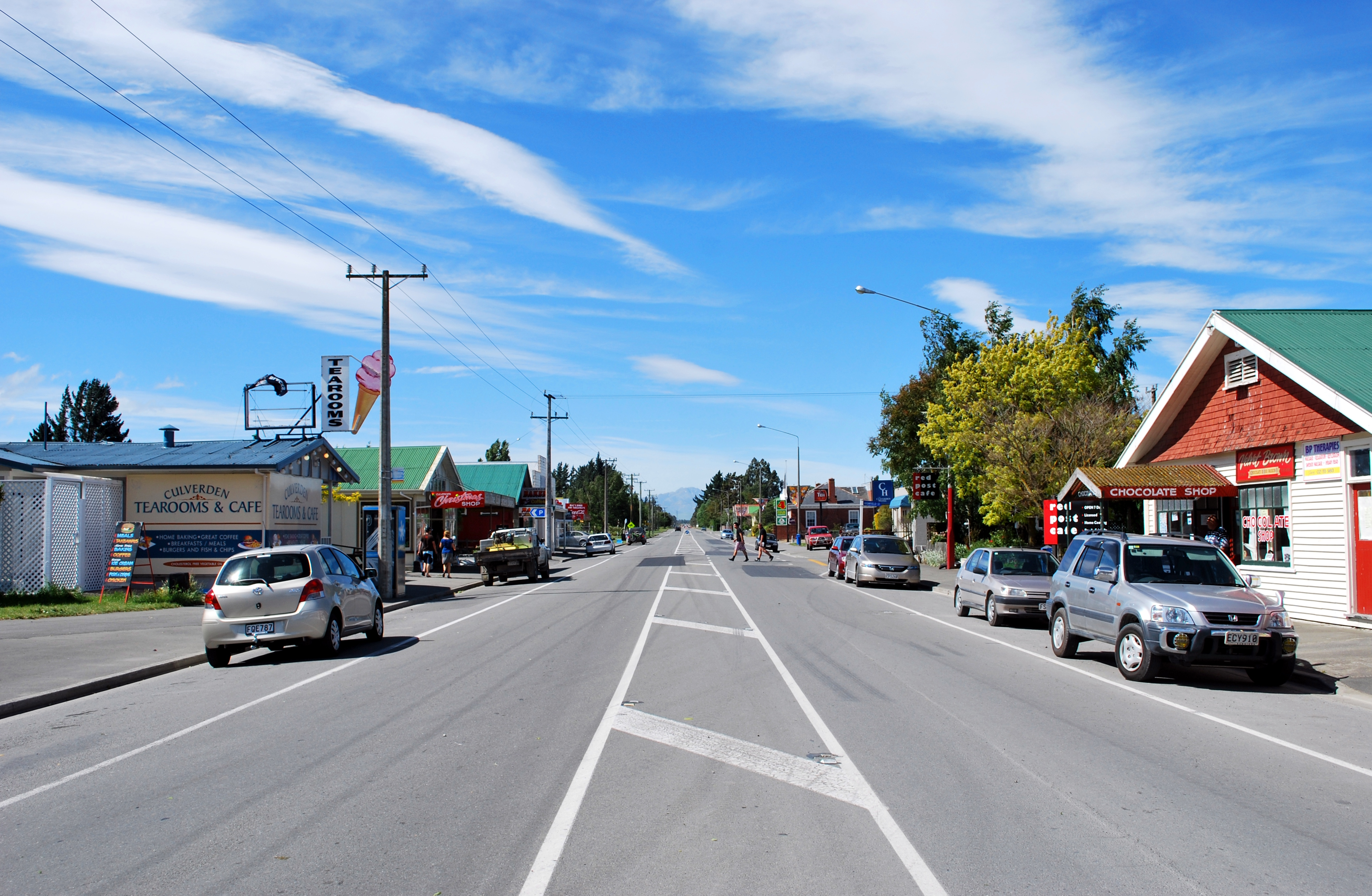
- Mountainview Road (New Zealand State Highway 7) in Culverden
- Interactive map of Culverden
- Coordinates: 42°46′S 172°51′E
- Country: New Zealand
- Region: Canterbury
- Territorial authority: Hurunui District
- Ward: West Ward
- Electorates: Kaikōura; Te Tai Tonga

Government
  - Territorial Authority: Hurunui District Council
  - Regional council: Environment Canterbury
  - Mayor of Hurunui: Marie Black
  - Kaikōura MP: Stuart Smith
  - Te Tai Tonga MP: Tākuta Ferris

Area
  - Total: 1.04 km^{2} (0.40 sq mi)
- Elevation: 179 m (587 ft)

Population (June 2025)
  - Total: 360
  - Density: 350/km^{2} (900/sq mi)
- Time zone: UTC+12 (New Zealand Standard Time)
  - Summer (DST): UTC+13 (New Zealand Daylight Time)
- Postcode: 7392
- Area code: 03
- Local iwi: Ngāi Tahu

Culverden is a small town in the northern Canterbury region of New Zealand's South Island. It lies at the centre of the Amuri Plain. Culverden has traditionally been surrounded by sheep farms. Dairy farms have now become more common as a result of irrigation schemes in the area. The Waiau Plains Irrigation Scheme was completed in 1980. It provides irrigation to 17,000 hectares of farmland and the Balmoral Scheme provides irrigation to a further 5,500 hectares.

The Health Department encouraged the Amuri County Council to install a water supply in Culverden as a result of a "slight epidemic" of hepatitis which was traced back to contaminated water. A town water supply was built in 1965.

Rubbish collection began in Culverden in 1972. A proposal to provide Culverden with a sewage scheme in 1983 was approved by the Amuri County Council. Residents were unhappy with the cost of it and it was never built. Culverden was still without a sewage scheme in 2000. Culverden had its telephone exchange upgraded to an automatic exchange in 1984. The Bank of New Zealand closed its branch in Culverden in 1988.

The Rutherford Reserve and the Culverden Recreation Reserve are on the southern side of Culverden and the Culverden Golf Course in on the northern entrance to Culverden. There is a memorial in the Rutherford Reserve to Dr. Charles Little who died in November 1918 from the Spanish Flu. He was the county doctor providing medical services from Waikari to Waiau.

== Local government ==
When provincial government was abolished in 1876, Culverden became the main centre for the newly established Amuri County. Counties were abolished in the 1989 local government reforms, and since then, Culverden has belonged to the Hurunui District.

== Demographics ==
Culverden is described by Stats NZ as a rural settlement and covers 1.04 km^{2} (0.40 sq mi). It had an estimated population of 360 as of June 2025, with a population density of 346 people per km^{2}. Culverden is part of the larger Amuri statistical area.

Historical population for Culverden
Year	Pop.	±% p.a.
2006	345	—
2013	363	+0.73%
2018	351	−0.67%
2023	339	−0.69%

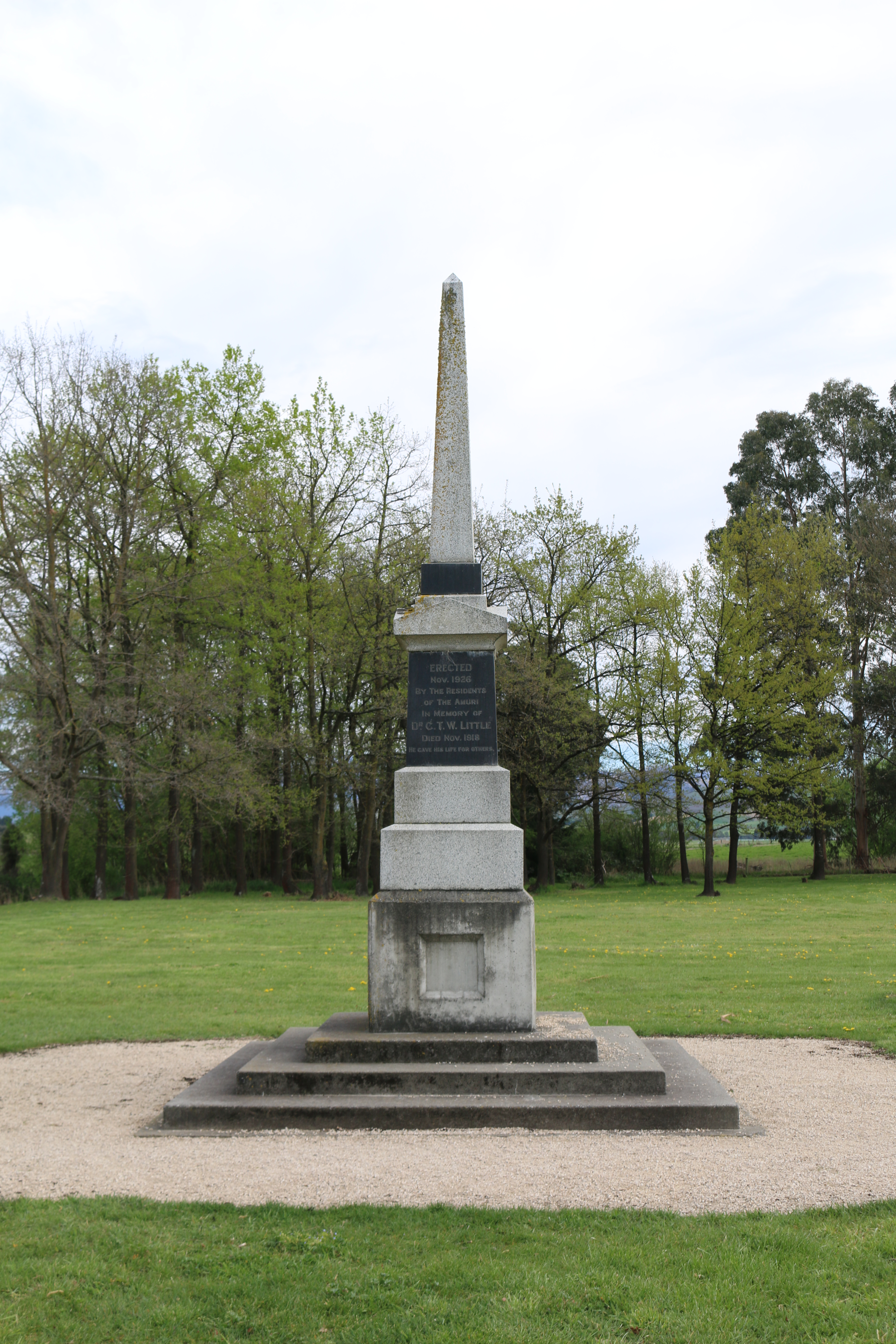
Memorial to Dr Charles Little in Culverden

Culverden had a population of 339 in the 2023 New Zealand census, a decrease of 12 people (−3.4%) since the 2018 census, and a decrease of 24 people (−6.6%) since the 2013 census. There were 168 males and 174 females in 153 dwellings. 3.5% of people identified as LGBTIQ+. The median age was 41.9 years (compared with 38.1 years nationally). There were 60 people (17.7%) aged under 15 years, 54 (15.9%) aged 15 to 29, 159 (46.9%) aged 30 to 64, and 66 (19.5%) aged 65 or older.

People could identify as more than one ethnicity. The results were 91.2% European (Pākehā), 12.4% Māori, 0.9% Pasifika, 7.1% Asian, and 1.8% other, which includes people giving their ethnicity as "New Zealander". English was spoken by 100.0%, Māori by 1.8%, and other languages by 7.1%. New Zealand Sign Language was known by 0.9%. The percentage of people born overseas was 13.3, compared with 28.8% nationally.

Religious affiliations were 37.2% Christian, and 1.8% other religions. People who answered that they had no religion were 53.1%, and 8.8% of people did not answer the census question.

Of those at least 15 years old, 33 (11.8%) people had a bachelor's or higher degree, 153 (54.8%) had a post-high school certificate or diploma, and 93 (33.3%) people exclusively held high school qualifications. The median income was $40,000, compared with $41,500 nationally. 18 people (6.5%) earned over $100,000 compared to 12.1% nationally. The employment status of those at least 15 was 144 (51.6%) full-time, 51 (18.3%) part-time, and 3 (1.1%) unemployed.

=== Amuri statistical area ===
Amuri statistical area, which includes Culverden, Rotherham and Waiau, covers 1,835.61 km^{2} (708.73 sq mi). It had an estimated population of 2,440 as of June 2025, with a population density of 1.3 people per km^{2}.

Historical population for Amuri
Year	Pop.	±% p.a.
2006	2,001	—
2013	2,097	+0.67%
2018	2,223	+1.17%
2023	2,217	−0.05%

Amuri had a population of 2,217 in the 2023 New Zealand census, a decrease of 6 people (−0.3%) since the 2018 census, and an increase of 120 people (5.7%) since the 2013 census. There were 1,179 males and 1,041 females in 972 dwellings. 2.3% of people identified as LGBTIQ+. The median age was 37.1 years (compared with 38.1 years nationally). There were 468 people (21.1%) aged under 15 years, 366 (16.5%) aged 15 to 29, 1,065 (48.0%) aged 30 to 64, and 321 (14.5%) aged 65 or older.

People could identify as more than one ethnicity. The results were 80.9% European (Pākehā); 11.5% Māori; 0.8% Pasifika; 12.6% Asian; 2.2% Middle Eastern, Latin American and African New Zealanders (MELAA); and 3.4% other, which includes people giving their ethnicity as "New Zealander". English was spoken by 97.4%, Māori by 1.6%, Samoan by 0.1%, and other languages by 10.0%. No language could be spoken by 1.9% (e.g. too young to talk). New Zealand Sign Language was known by 0.4%. The percentage of people born overseas was 21.1, compared with 28.8% nationally.

Religious affiliations were 35.3% Christian, 0.7% Hindu, 0.3% Islam, 0.1% Māori religious beliefs, 0.3% Buddhist, 0.3% New Age, and 1.4% other religions. People who answered that they had no religion were 55.1%, and 6.9% of people did not answer the census question.

Of those at least 15 years old, 327 (18.7%) people had a bachelor's or higher degree, 948 (54.2%) had a post-high school certificate or diploma, and 480 (27.4%) people exclusively held high school qualifications. The median income was $46,800, compared with $41,500 nationally. 165 people (9.4%) earned over $100,000 compared to 12.1% nationally. The employment status of those at least 15 was 1,017 (58.1%) full-time, 303 (17.3%) part-time, and 30 (1.7%) unemployed.

== Notable Buildings ==
=== Amuri County Offices ===
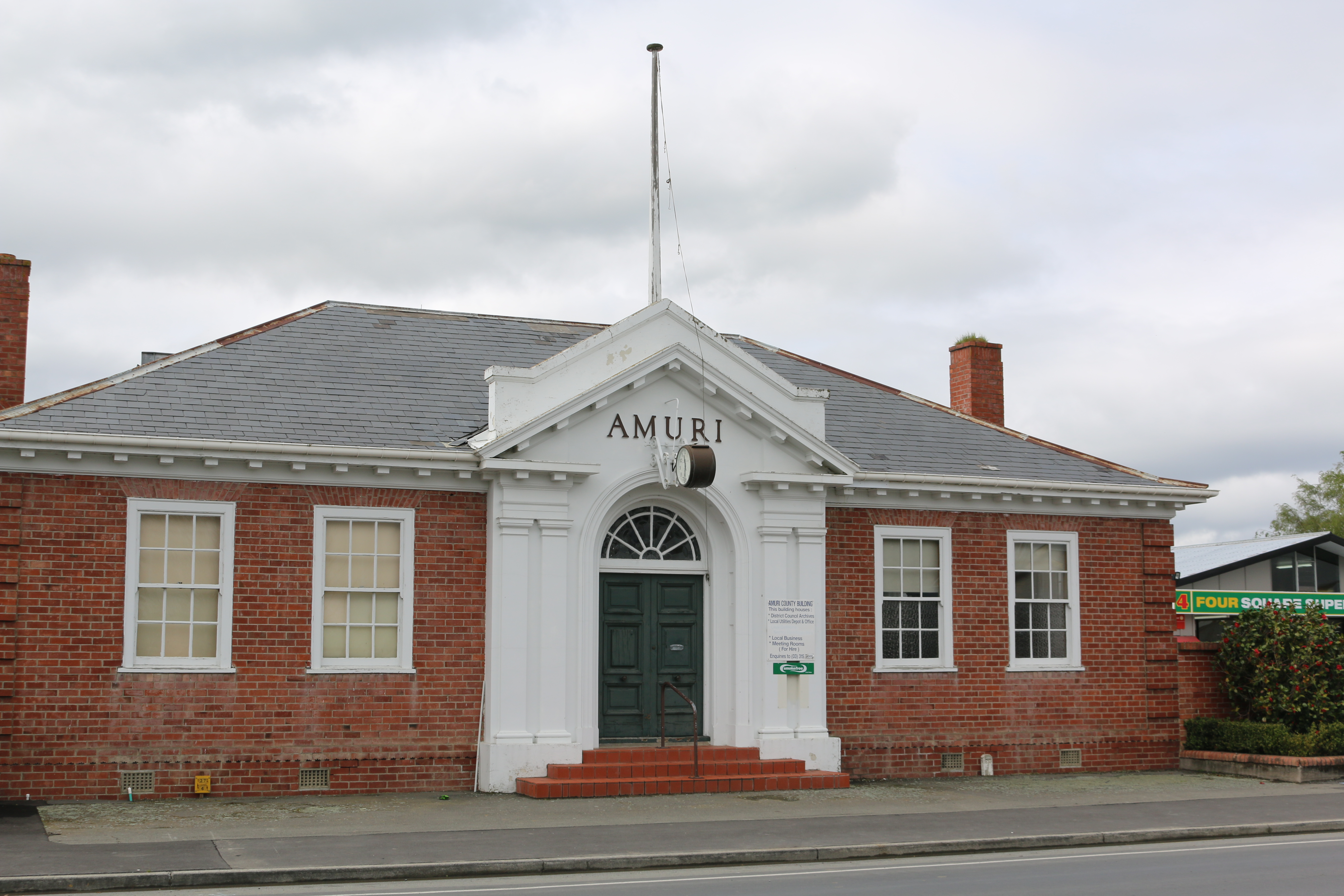
Amuri County Office, Culverden

This was designed in a Georgian style. It was earthquake damaged and the Hurunui District Council was looking at repairing and strengthening the building. It was for sale in October 2020.

=== Amuri Co-operating Church ===
The Amuri Co-operating Church, formerly Saint Andrews Presbyterian Church, Culverden, It has a stained glass window entitled "Christ the Shepherd and Sheep Farmer", designed by Beverley Shore Bennett and executed by Roy Miller in 1973.

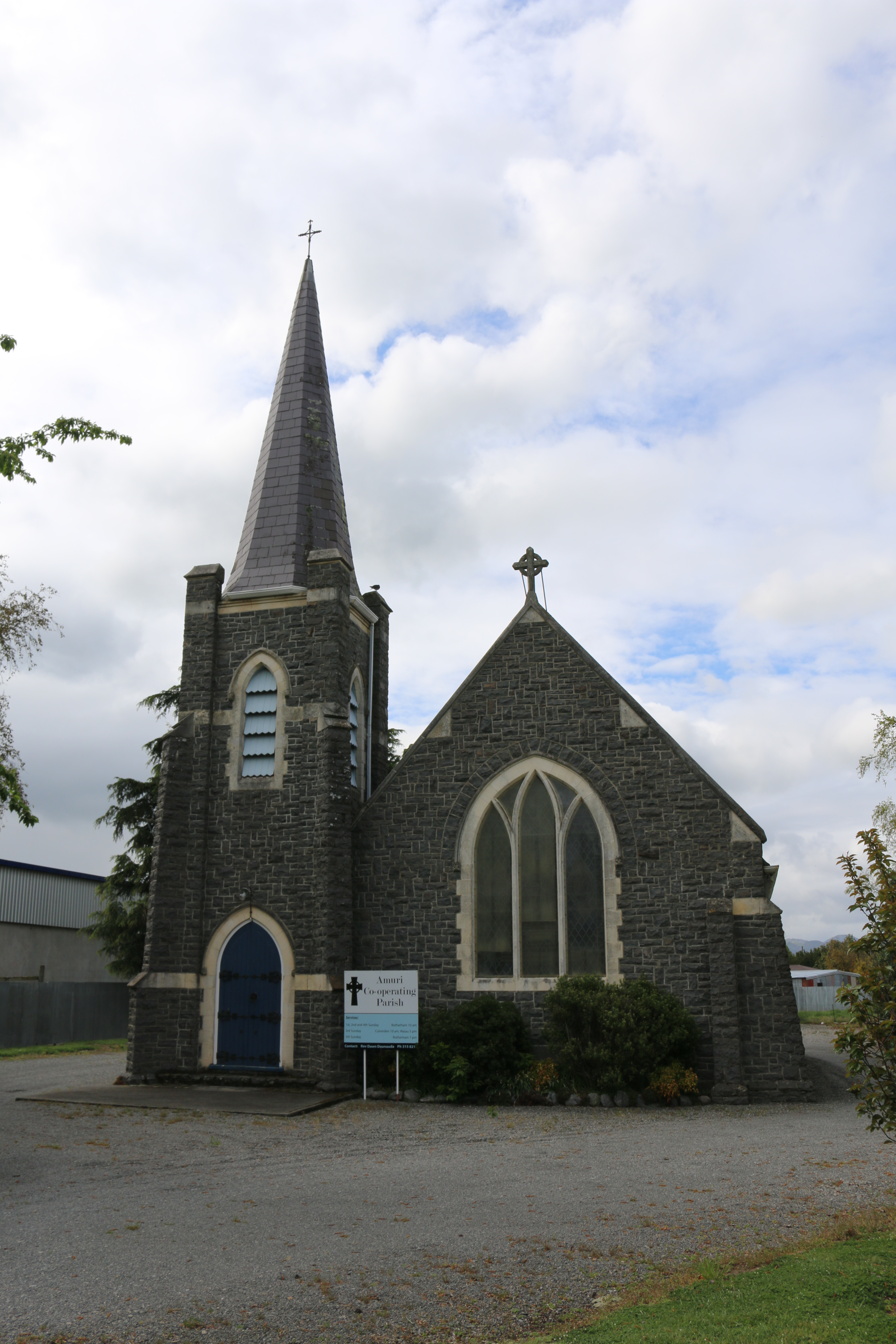
Amuri Co-operating Church

=== Mockett Motors ===
Mockett Motors is designed in an Art Deco style. The business has been present in Culverden for over 100 years,

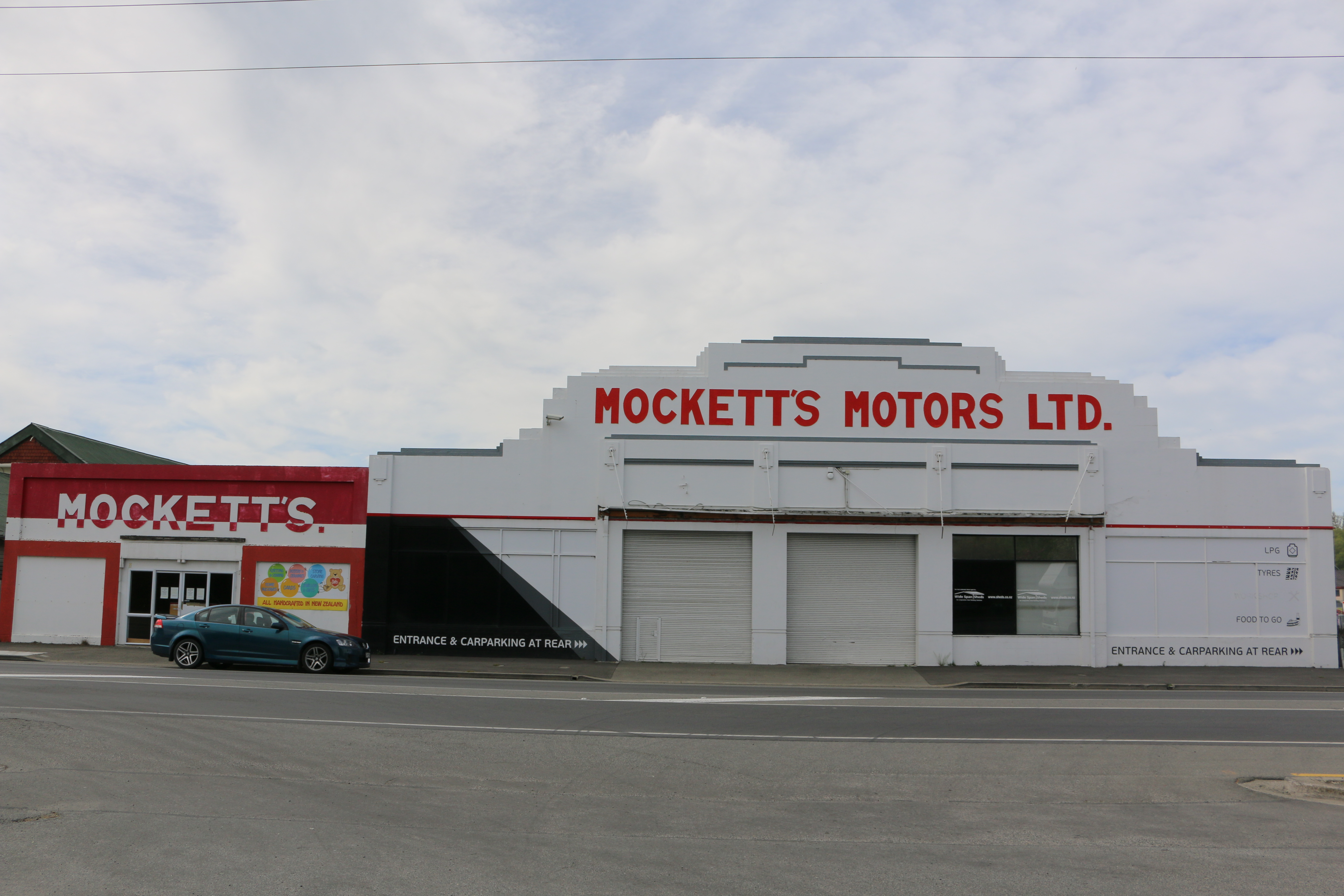
Mockett Motors, Built in an Art Deco Style.

== Transport ==
State Highway 7 passes through Culverden, forming the town's main street.

Culvenden was also once an important railway terminus, with the railway line extended from Medbury across the Hurunui River to Culverden on 8 February 1886. It was envisaged that this route would become the Main North Line to Nelson and Blenheim, but a coastal route via Parnassus and Kaikōura was chosen instead. The branch line to Culverden was extended beyond the town to Waiau in 1919 and became known as the Waiau Branch. At the line's peak, when it was considered to be part of the Main North Line, multiple trains ran daily between Culverden and Christchurch, including the Culverden Express and a number of slower mixed trains that carried both freight and passengers. Regular passenger services were replaced by buses on 29 January 1939 and after becoming uneconomic, the railway through Culverden was closed entirely on 15 January 1978. Little now remains of the town's railway except a loading bank at the site of the old station.

== Education ==
Amuri Area School is the sole school in Culverden, catering for Year 1 to 13 students (ages 5 to 18), with a roll of approximately 348 students. It opened in 1896 as Culverden Primary School. In 1960 it became Culverden District High School. It became an area school in 1977.

== Notable people ==
Cricketer Amy Satterthwaite (born 1986) grew up in Culverden.

== Sport ==
The Kaiwara Classic Mountain Bike Race starts in Culverden and Cheviot via the Kaiwara Road.

== Climate ==
Climate data for Culverden (1991–2020)
Month	Jan	Feb	Mar	Apr	May	Jun	Jul	Aug	Sep	Oct	Nov	Dec	Year
Mean daily maximum °C (°F)	22.6 (72.7)	22.7 (72.9)	20.4 (68.7)	17.5 (63.5)	14.8 (58.6)	11.3 (52.3)	11.1 (52.0)	12.6 (54.7)	14.7 (58.5)	17.0 (62.6)	18.5 (65.3)	20.9 (69.6)	17.0 (62.6)
Daily mean °C (°F)	17.0 (62.6)	16.7 (62.1)	14.5 (58.1)	11.6 (52.9)	9.1 (48.4)	5.8 (42.4)	5.6 (42.1)	7.1 (44.8)	9.4 (48.9)	11.2 (52.2)	13.1 (55.6)	15.5 (59.9)	11.4 (52.5)
Mean daily minimum °C (°F)	11.4 (52.5)	10.7 (51.3)	8.6 (47.5)	5.7 (42.3)	3.4 (38.1)	0.3 (32.5)	0.2 (32.4)	1.6 (34.9)	4.0 (39.2)	5.5 (41.9)	7.7 (45.9)	10.1 (50.2)	5.8 (42.4)
Average rainfall mm (inches)	43.4 (1.71)	40.3 (1.59)	47.2 (1.86)	51.2 (2.02)	48.5 (1.91)	61.6 (2.43)	56.8 (2.24)	45.2 (1.78)	41.7 (1.64)	52.9 (2.08)	47.0 (1.85)	48.1 (1.89)	583.9 (23)
Source: NIWA
