= Mendip Hills Station =

Coordinates: 42°37′57.13″S 173°16′55.42″E

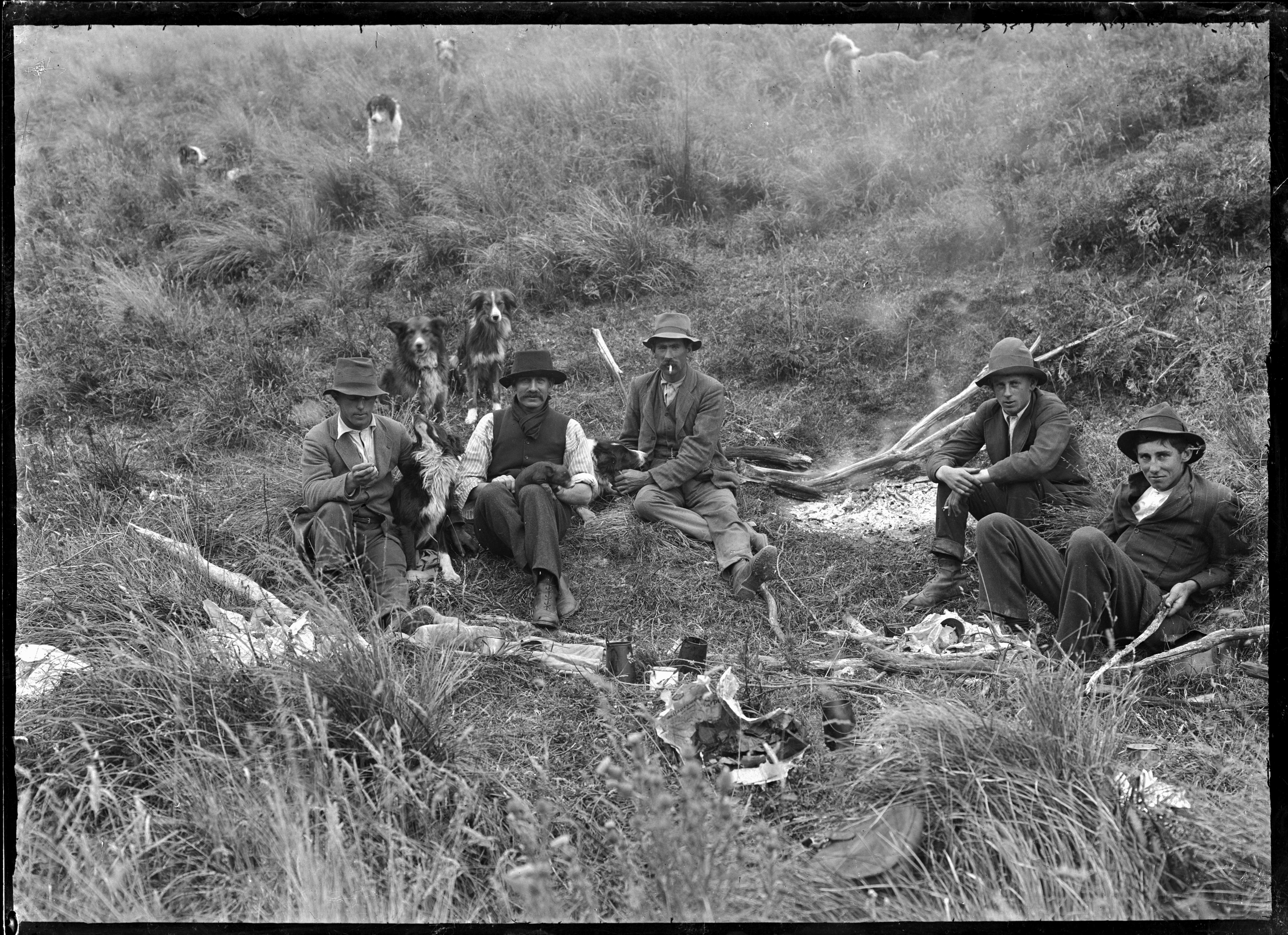
Sheep farmers and their dogs around a campfire in Mendip Hills

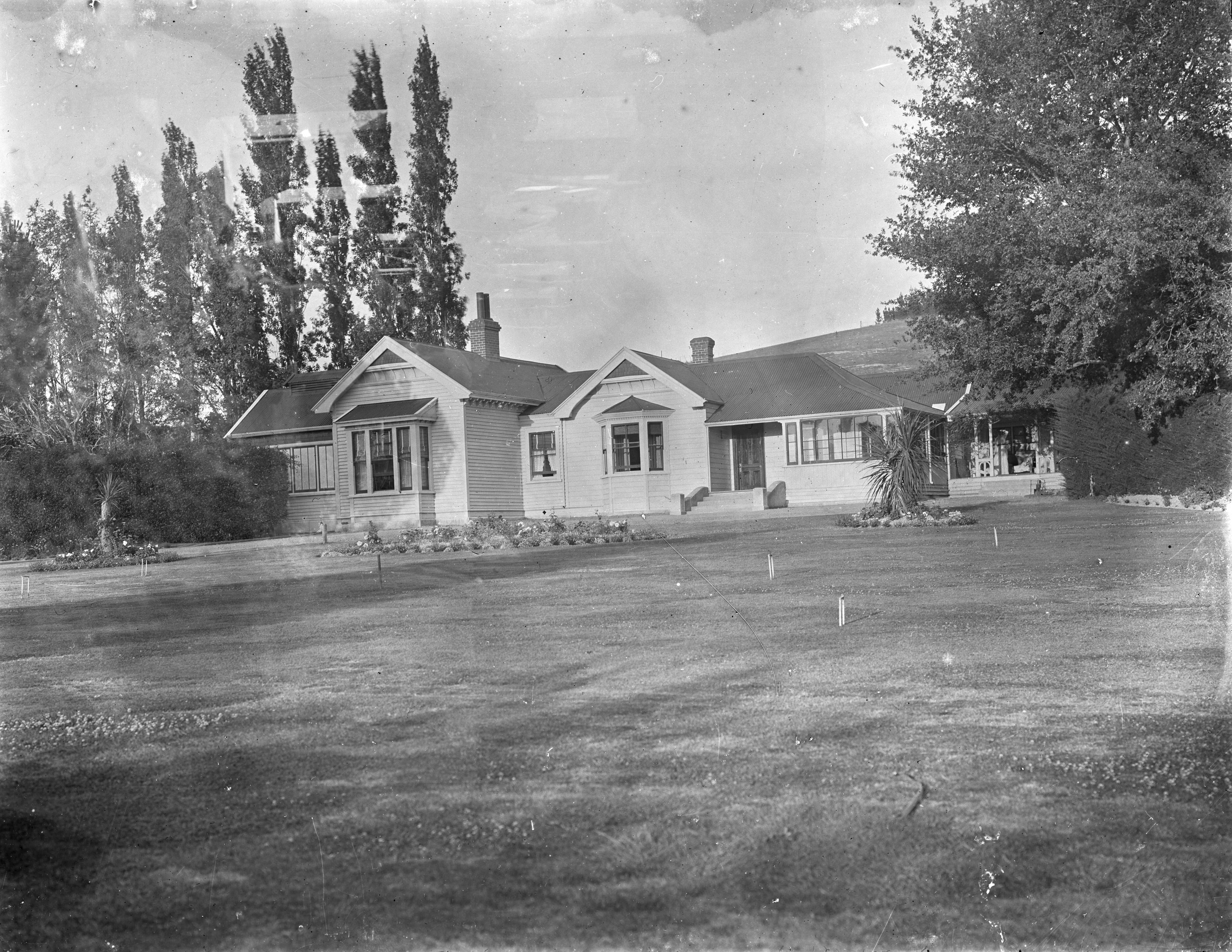
Homestead at Mendip Hills in 1917

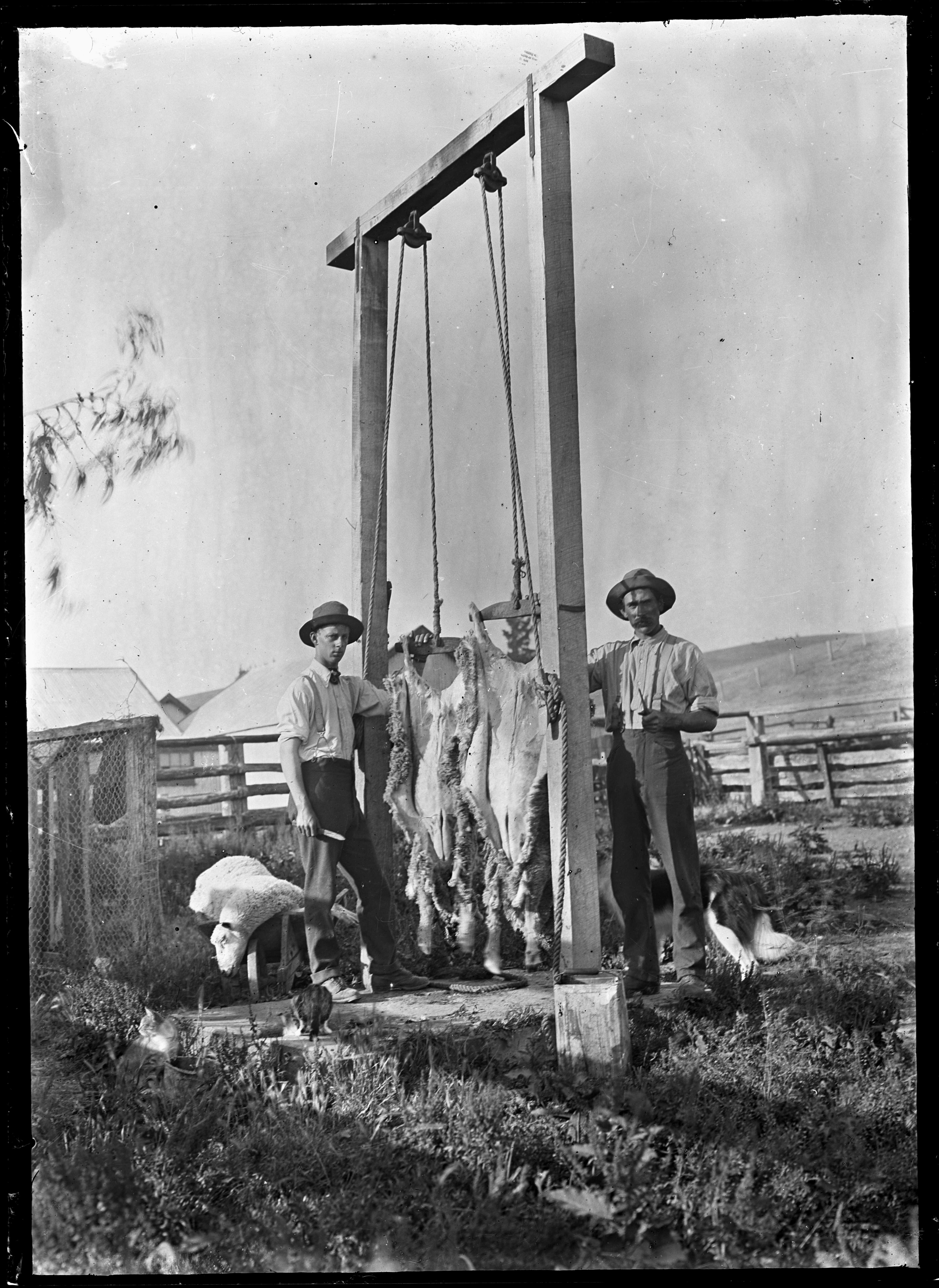
Outdoor abattoir with sheep strung up for skinning and butchering

Mendip Hills Station is a sheep, cattle, and deer rearing area near Parnassus in North Canterbury, New Zealand. A 2016 earthquake badly damaged buildings in the area including a historic homestead. The National Library of New Zealand has several photos of the area in its collection. The station dates to 1861. Audrey Steele published a book in 1974 about her life at the station after she became a bride in 1924.
