= Waiau, Canterbury =

Town in Canterbury, New Zealand

Waiau
- town
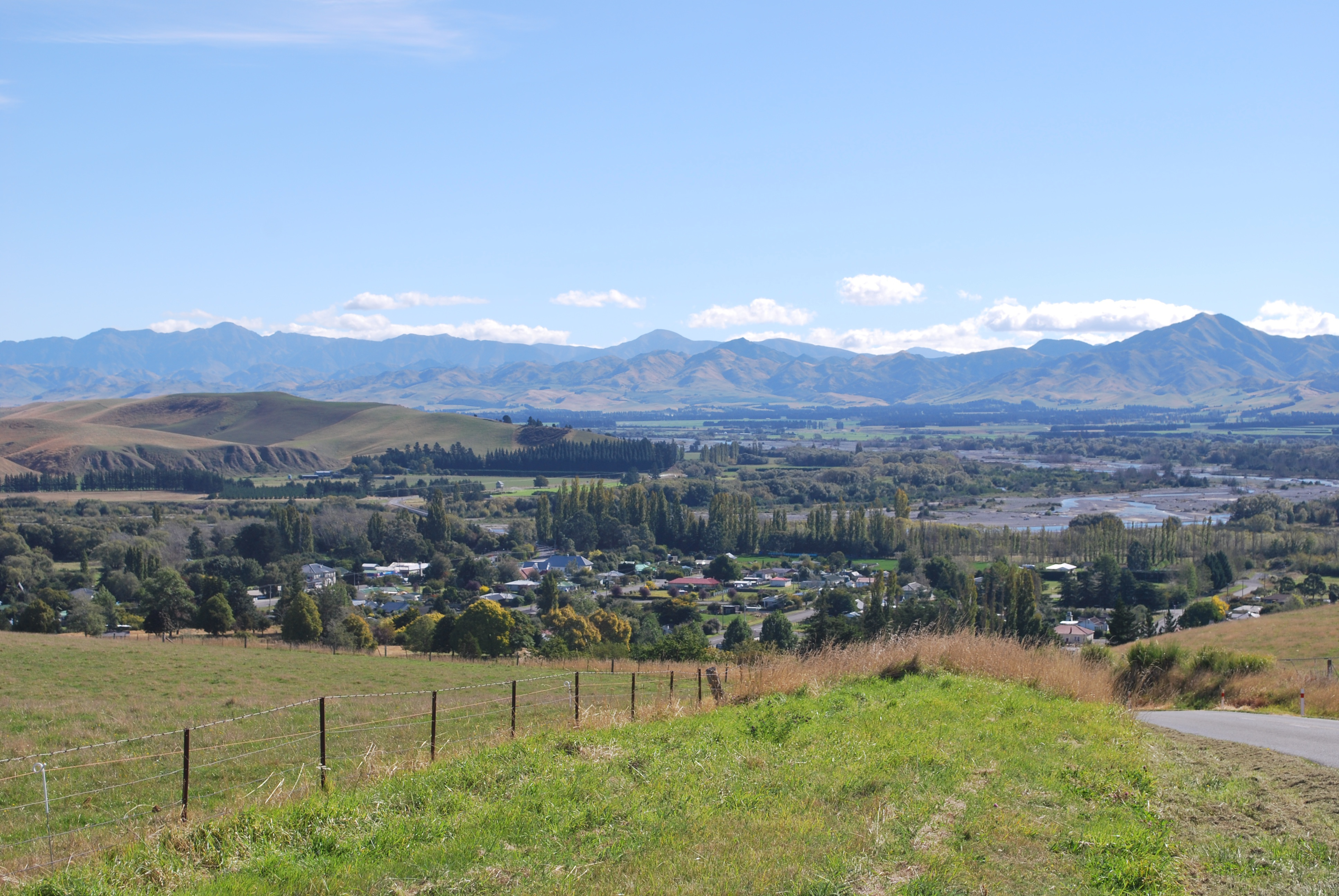
- Waiau seen from the Leader Road. The Waiau Uwha River is in the background
- Interactive map of Waiau
- Coordinates: 42°39′16″S 173°02′33″E
- Country: New Zealand
- Region: Canterbury
- Territorial authority: Hurunui District
- Ward: West Ward
- Electorates: Kaikōura; Te Tai Tonga

Government
  - Territorial Authority: Hurunui District Council
  - Regional council: Environment Canterbury
  - Mayor of Hurunui: Marie Black
  - Kaikoura MP: Stuart Smith
  - Te Tai Tonga MP: Tākuta Ferris

Area
  - Total: 0.97 km^{2} (0.37 sq mi)

Population (June 2025)
  - Total: 270
  - Density: 280/km^{2} (720/sq mi)
- Time zone: UTC+12 (New Zealand Standard Time)
  - Summer (DST): UTC+13 (New Zealand Daylight Time)
- Postcode: 7332

Waiau is a small town in north Canterbury, in the South Island of New Zealand. It lies 30 kilometres (19 mi) east of Hanmer Springs on the northern bank of the Waiau Uwha River, some 30 kilometres (19 mi) from the river's mouth. There is a small supermarket, a DIY store and a petrol station.

== History ==
Waiau is the largest town on State Highway 70, also known as the Inland Kaikōura Route. From 1919 until 1978, Waiau was the terminus of the Waiau Branch, a branch line railway that ran to the town from a junction with the Main North Line in Waipara. There were proposals to extend this line beyond Waiau as part of the Main North Line and some 3 kilometres (1.9 mi) of formation was made for a route to Kaikōura, but construction ground to a halt and a coastal route via Parnassus and Hundalee was chosen for the Main North Line instead.

Waiau had at one stage three churches: a Presbyterian church, an Anglican church and a Catholic church. The Catholic Parish of the Good Shepard was opened in 1900 and has seating for 100.

Waiau was heavily impacted by the 2016 Kaikōura earthquake as the epicentre was 15 kilometres (9 mi) north-east of Culverden making it more like the Waiau earthquake. Buildings damaged by the earthquake include many homes, the Waiau Lodge Hotel, historic cottage, bowling green, church, netball courts and swimming pool. A historic woolshed at Highfield just north of Waiau, built in 1877, which was significantly damaged in the earthquake has been restored and has retained its Heritage New Zealand Category 1 status.

Waiau shares its name with several much smaller settlements and farming communities within New Zealand. The name is Māori, and means flowing water.

== Demographics ==
Waiau is described by Stats NZ as a rural settlement and covers 0.97 km^{2} (0.37 sq mi). It had an estimated population of 270 as of June 2025, with a population density of 278 people per km^{2}. Waiau is part of the larger Amuri statistical area.

Historical population
Year	Pop.	±% p.a.
2006	252	—
2013	261	+0.50%
2018	252	−0.70%
2023	261	+0.70%

Waiau had a population of 261 in the 2023 New Zealand census, an increase of 9 people (3.6%) since the 2018 census, and unchanged since the 2013 census. There were 135 males and 129 females in 120 dwellings. 2.3% of people identified as LGBTIQ+. The median age was 48.5 years (compared with 38.1 years nationally). There were 39 people (14.9%) aged under 15 years, 42 (16.1%) aged 15 to 29, 126 (48.3%) aged 30 to 64, and 54 (20.7%) aged 65 or older.

People could identify as more than one ethnicity. The results were 86.2% European (Pākehā), 23.0% Māori, 1.1% Asian, and 2.3% other, which includes people giving their ethnicity as "New Zealander". English was spoken by 97.7%, Māori by 2.3%, and other languages by 3.4%. No language could be spoken by 1.1% (e.g. too young to talk). New Zealand Sign Language was known by 1.1%. The percentage of people born overseas was 12.6, compared with 28.8% nationally.

Religious affiliations were 19.5% Christian, 1.1% Hindu, 1.1% Māori religious beliefs, and 1.1% other religions. People who answered that they had no religion were 62.1%, and 14.9% of people did not answer the census question.

Of those at least 15 years old, 21 (9.5%) people had a bachelor's or higher degree, 117 (52.7%) had a post-high school certificate or diploma, and 81 (36.5%) people exclusively held high school qualifications. The median income was $28,100, compared with $41,500 nationally. 9 people (4.1%) earned over $100,000 compared to 12.1% nationally. The employment status of those at least 15 was 96 (43.2%) full-time, 33 (14.9%) part-time, and 9 (4.1%) unemployed.

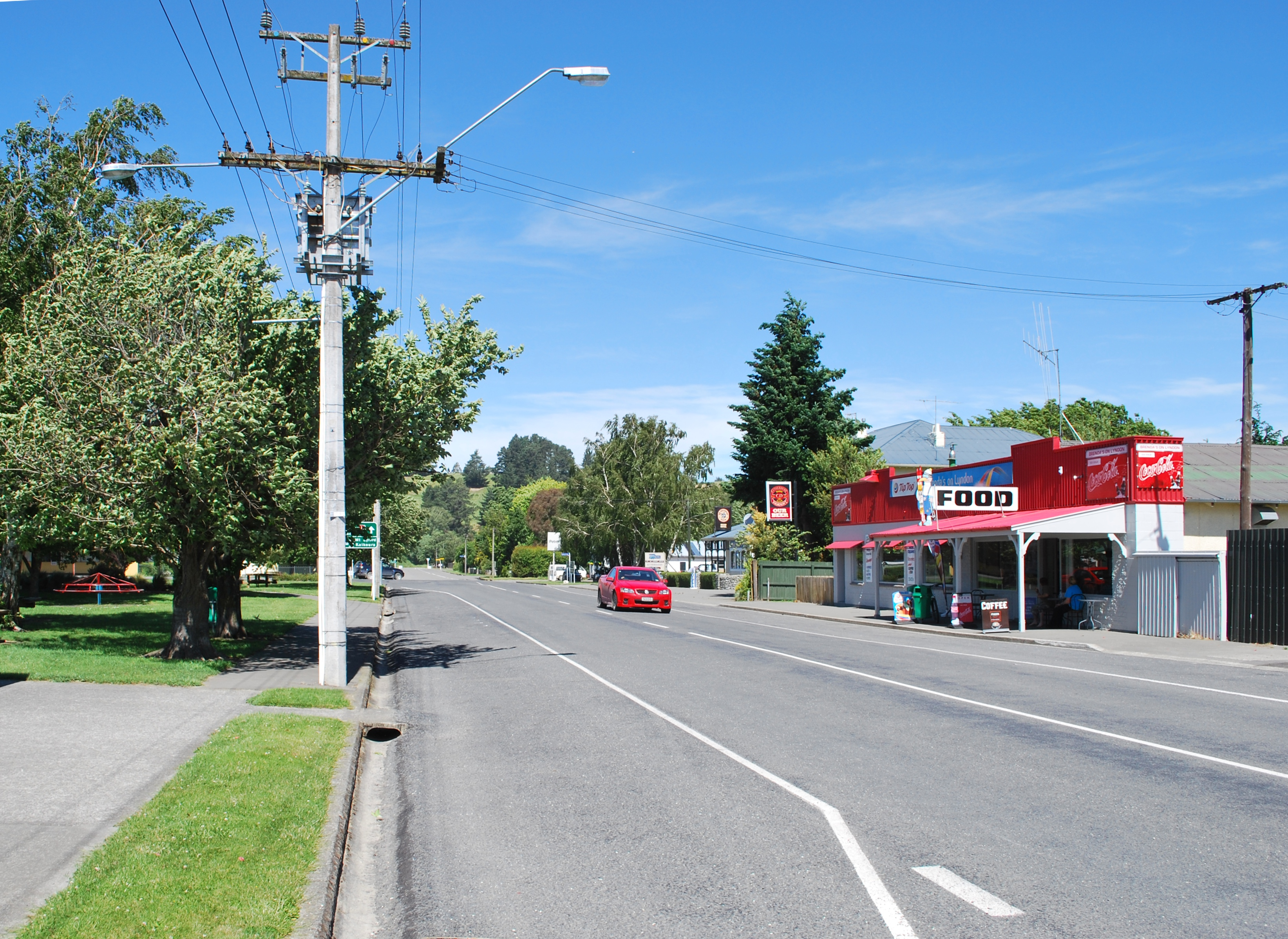
Lyndon Street

== Education ==
Waiau School is a co-educational state primary school for Year 1 to 6 students, with a roll of 30 as of July 2026. It opened in 1877.

== Swimming Pool ==
The Waiau Community Pool was built in 2019. The complex includes a 25 metre swimming pool and a smaller toddlers pool. The previous pool in use was destroyed in the 2016 earthquake.

== Waiau Lodge Hotel ==
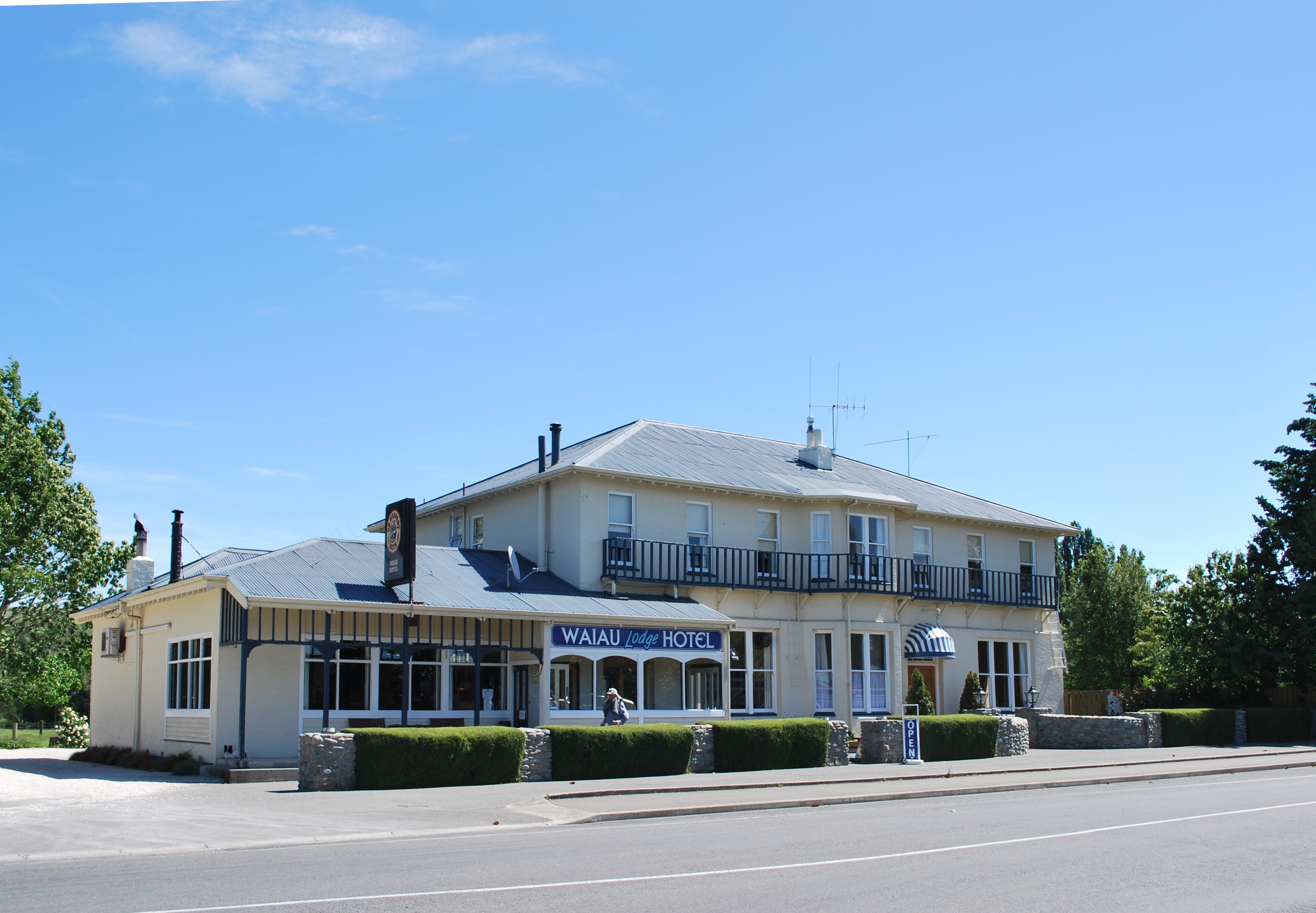
Waiau Lodge Hotel in 2011

The Waiau Lodge Hotel was built in 1910. It originally had ten bedrooms for guests. The hotel was known as the "Grand Lady". Frederick O'Malley was the first publican to run the Waiau Lodge Hotel. He sold the hotel in 1913 to Arthur Johnstone. There have been a further 21 owners. The hotel was badly damaged in the 2016 Kaikōura earthquake. All three of the hotel's chimneys had crashed through the roof causing extensive damage. A temporary pub called the Waiau Tavern was set up in the car park for the town's residents and opened six months later. In May 2021, the Waiau Lodge Hotel was destroyed by a fire. Approximately thirty firefighters attempted to put out the fire which started late at night.

== Climate ==
The mean yearly highest and lowest temperatures for Waiau from 2008–2024 was 34.8 °C (95 °F) and −5.8 °C (22 °F) respectively.

Climate data for Waiau (1991–2020 normals, extremes 1974–1989, 2008–present)
Month	Jan	Feb	Mar	Apr	May	Jun	Jul	Aug	Sep	Oct	Nov	Dec	Year
Record high °C (°F)	37.8 (100.0)	36.5 (97.7)	33.2 (91.8)	29.3 (84.7)	27.1 (80.8)	23.8 (74.8)	21.8 (71.2)	24.0 (75.2)	26.1 (79.0)	30.3 (86.5)	32.9 (91.2)	34.7 (94.5)	37.8 (100.0)
Mean daily maximum °C (°F)	24.6 (76.3)	24.4 (75.9)	21.9 (71.4)	18.7 (65.7)	15.8 (60.4)	12.1 (53.8)	12.0 (53.6)	13.8 (56.8)	16.1 (61.0)	18.3 (64.9)	20.2 (68.4)	22.9 (73.2)	18.4 (65.1)
Daily mean °C (°F)	18.1 (64.6)	17.6 (63.7)	15.1 (59.2)	12.1 (53.8)	9.4 (48.9)	6.2 (43.2)	6.0 (42.8)	7.6 (45.7)	10.0 (50.0)	11.9 (53.4)	14.0 (57.2)	16.5 (61.7)	12.0 (53.7)
Mean daily minimum °C (°F)	11.6 (52.9)	10.8 (51.4)	8.4 (47.1)	5.4 (41.7)	3.1 (37.6)	0.3 (32.5)	0.0 (32.0)	1.4 (34.5)	4.0 (39.2)	5.5 (41.9)	7.7 (45.9)	10.1 (50.2)	5.7 (42.2)
Record low °C (°F)	0.6 (33.1)	0.0 (32.0)	−0.9 (30.4)	−4.0 (24.8)	−7.4 (18.7)	−8.8 (16.2)	−7.9 (17.8)	−6.6 (20.1)	−4.4 (24.1)	−3.5 (25.7)	−1.5 (29.3)	−2.5 (27.5)	−8.8 (16.2)
Average rainfall mm (inches)	58.8 (2.31)	51.2 (2.02)	65.5 (2.58)	57.5 (2.26)	62.1 (2.44)	81.1 (3.19)	74.7 (2.94)	68.7 (2.70)	59.8 (2.35)	68.9 (2.71)	66.7 (2.63)	57.7 (2.27)	772.7 (30.4)
Source: NIWA
