= Hanmer Conservation Park =

Forest park in New Zealand

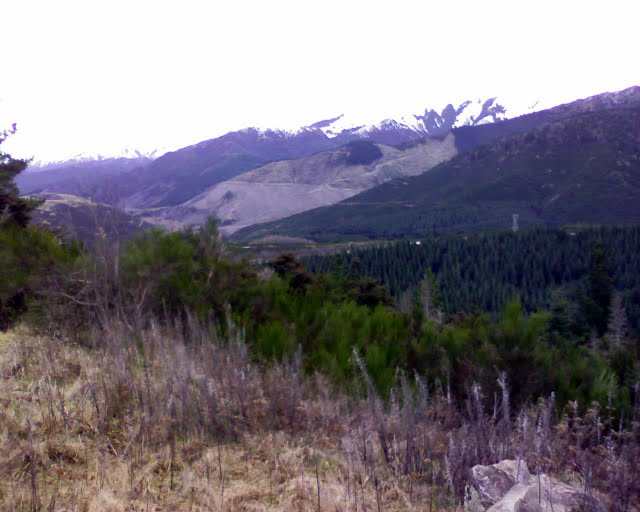
- Hanmer Conservation Park

- Location within New Zealand
- Location: New Zealand
- Coordinates: 42.5545058°S 172.7099264°E
- Area: 11,780 hectares (29,100 acres)
- Established: 1978
- Governing body: Department of Conservation

Hanmer Conservation Park is a protected area in the Hurunui District and Canterbury Region of New Zealand's South Island.

== Geography ==
The park covers 11,780 hectares (29,100 acres).

== History ==
The park was established in 1978.
