= Parnassus, New Zealand =

Locality in Canterbury, New Zealand

Parnassus
- Locality
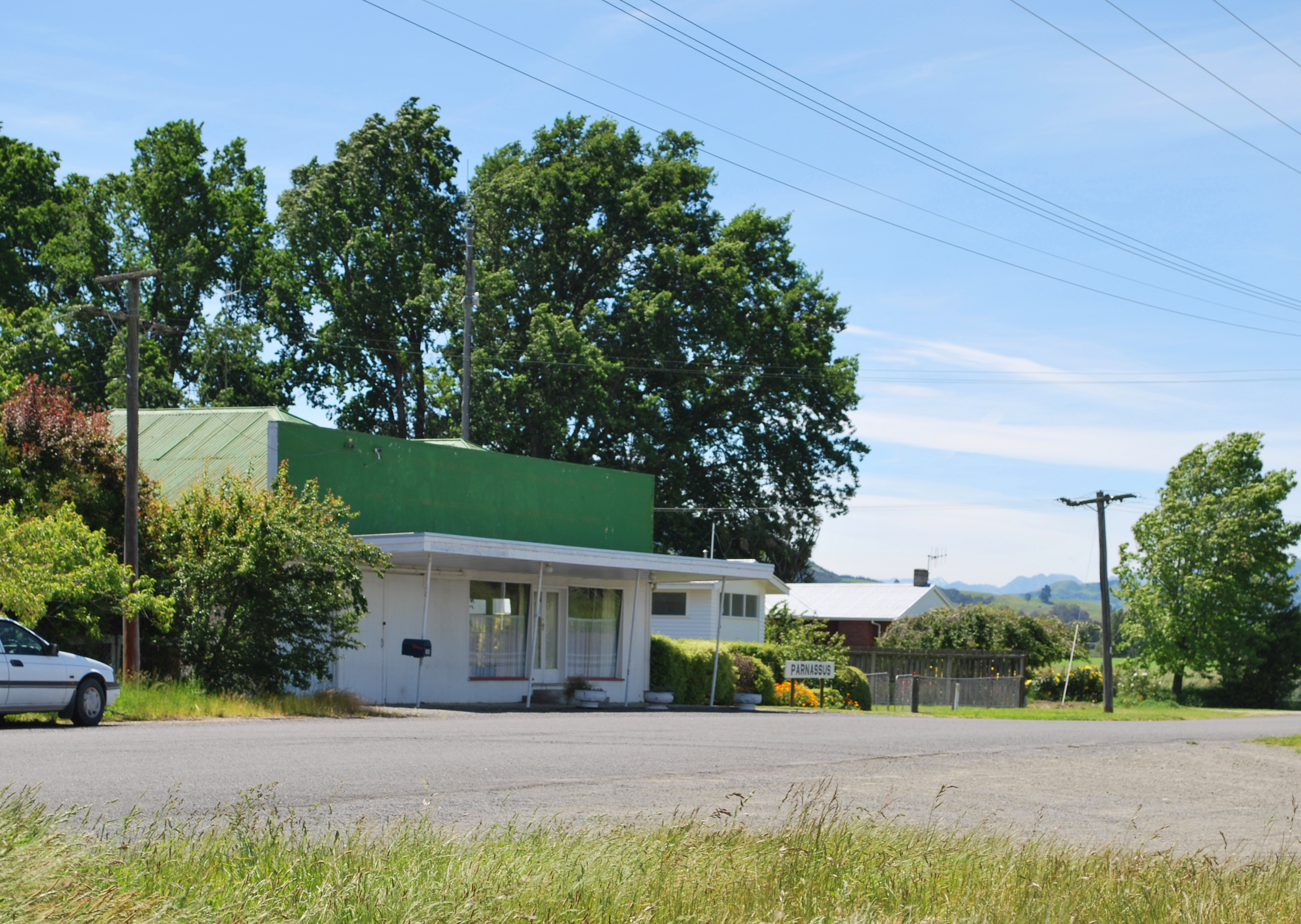
- The former supermarket at Parnassus
- Interactive map of Parnassus
- Coordinates: 42°43′S 173°18′E
- Country: New Zealand
- Region: Canterbury
- Territorial authority: Hurunui District
- Ward: East Ward
- Electorates: Kaikōura; Te Tai Tonga

Government
  - Territorial Authority: Hurunui District Council
  - Regional council: Environment Canterbury
  - Mayor of Hurunui: Marie Black
  - Kaikōura MP: Stuart Smith
  - Te Tai Tonga MP: Tākuta Ferris
- Time zone: UTC+12 (New Zealand Standard Time)
  - Summer (DST): UTC+13 (New Zealand Daylight Time)

Parnassus is a locality in the Canterbury region's Hurunui District on the east coast of New Zealand's South Island. It is located on the north bank of the Waiau Uwha River.

It takes its name from a local sheep run owned by a classical scholar, Edward Lee. He saw a likeness between a local hill and the Greek Mount Parnassus, mythical home of the god Apollo and the Muses.

State Highway 1 passes through the town on its route from Cheviot to Kaikōura, and the Main North Line railway from Christchurch to Picton also runs through the town. At one stage, the Waiau Branch was intended to be the main line north and a branch line diverged from the Waiau route in Waipara to service coastal communities. This line was opened to Parnassus in 1912 and was known as the Parnassus Branch at that stage. However, the decision was made to use the Parnassus route as the main line, relegating the route from Waipara through the Weka Pass to Waiau to the status of branch line. The Main North Line was completed in 1945 and continues to serve Parnassus today.

The epicentre of the 1901 Cheviot earthquake was at Parnassus.

== Demographics ==
The Parnassus statistical area, which includes Cheviot, Gore Bay and Hundalee, covers 994.57 km^{2} (384.01 sq mi). It had an estimated population of 1,430 as of June 2025, with a population density of 1.4 people per km^{2}.

Historical population
Year	Pop.	±% p.a.
2006	1,272	—
2013	1,308	+0.40%
2018	1,323	+0.23%
2023	1,419	+1.41%

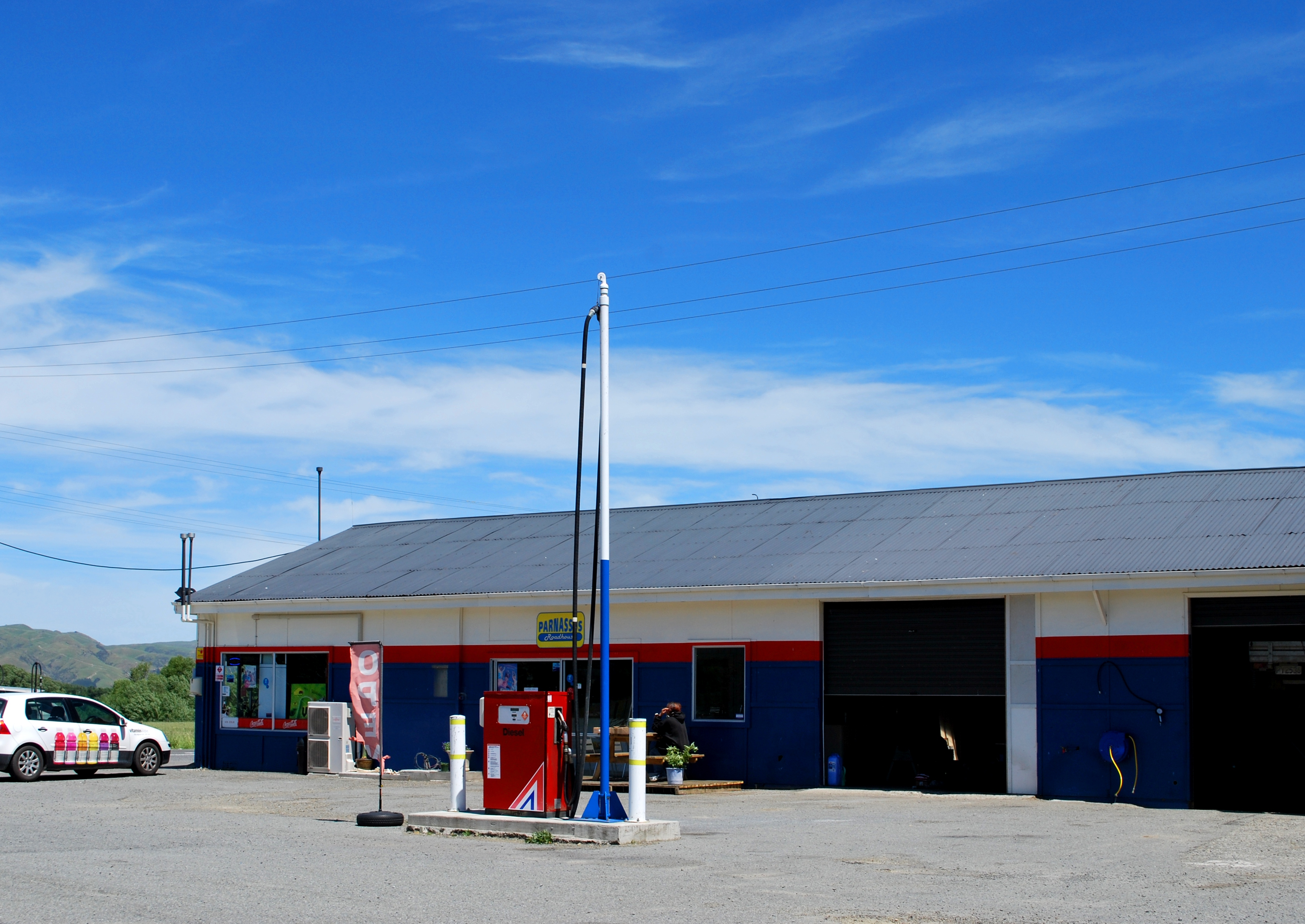
Parnassus Roadhouse

Parnassus had a population of 1,419 in the 2023 New Zealand census, an increase of 96 people (7.3%) since the 2018 census, and an increase of 111 people (8.5%) since the 2013 census. There were 726 males, 687 females, and 3 people of other genders in 609 dwellings. 1.9% of people identified as LGBTIQ+. The median age was 45.5 years (compared with 38.1 years nationally). There were 276 people (19.5%) aged under 15 years, 174 (12.3%) aged 15 to 29, 633 (44.6%) aged 30 to 64, and 336 (23.7%) aged 65 or older.

People could identify as more than one ethnicity. The results were 91.8% European (Pākehā); 12.1% Māori; 2.1% Pasifika; 3.0% Asian; 0.4% Middle Eastern, Latin American and African New Zealanders (MELAA); and 2.1% other, which includes people giving their ethnicity as "New Zealander". English was spoken by 97.0%, Māori by 2.1%, Samoan by 0.6%, and other languages by 6.6%. No language could be spoken by 2.1% (e.g. too young to talk). New Zealand Sign Language was known by 0.6%. The percentage of people born overseas was 14.4, compared with 28.8% nationally.

Religious affiliations were 30.2% Christian, 0.2% Hindu, 0.6% Māori religious beliefs, 0.4% Buddhist, 0.6% New Age, and 0.4% other religions. People who answered that they had no religion were 57.3%, and 9.5% of people did not answer the census question.

Of those at least 15 years old, 180 (15.7%) people had a bachelor's or higher degree, 630 (55.1%) had a post-high school certificate or diploma, and 330 (28.9%) people exclusively held high school qualifications. The median income was $34,000, compared with $41,500 nationally. 72 people (6.3%) earned over $100,000 compared to 12.1% nationally. The employment status of those at least 15 was 522 (45.7%) full-time, 228 (19.9%) part-time, and 15 (1.3%) unemployed.
