= Hawarden, New Zealand =

Town in Canterbury, New Zealand

Hawarden
- Town
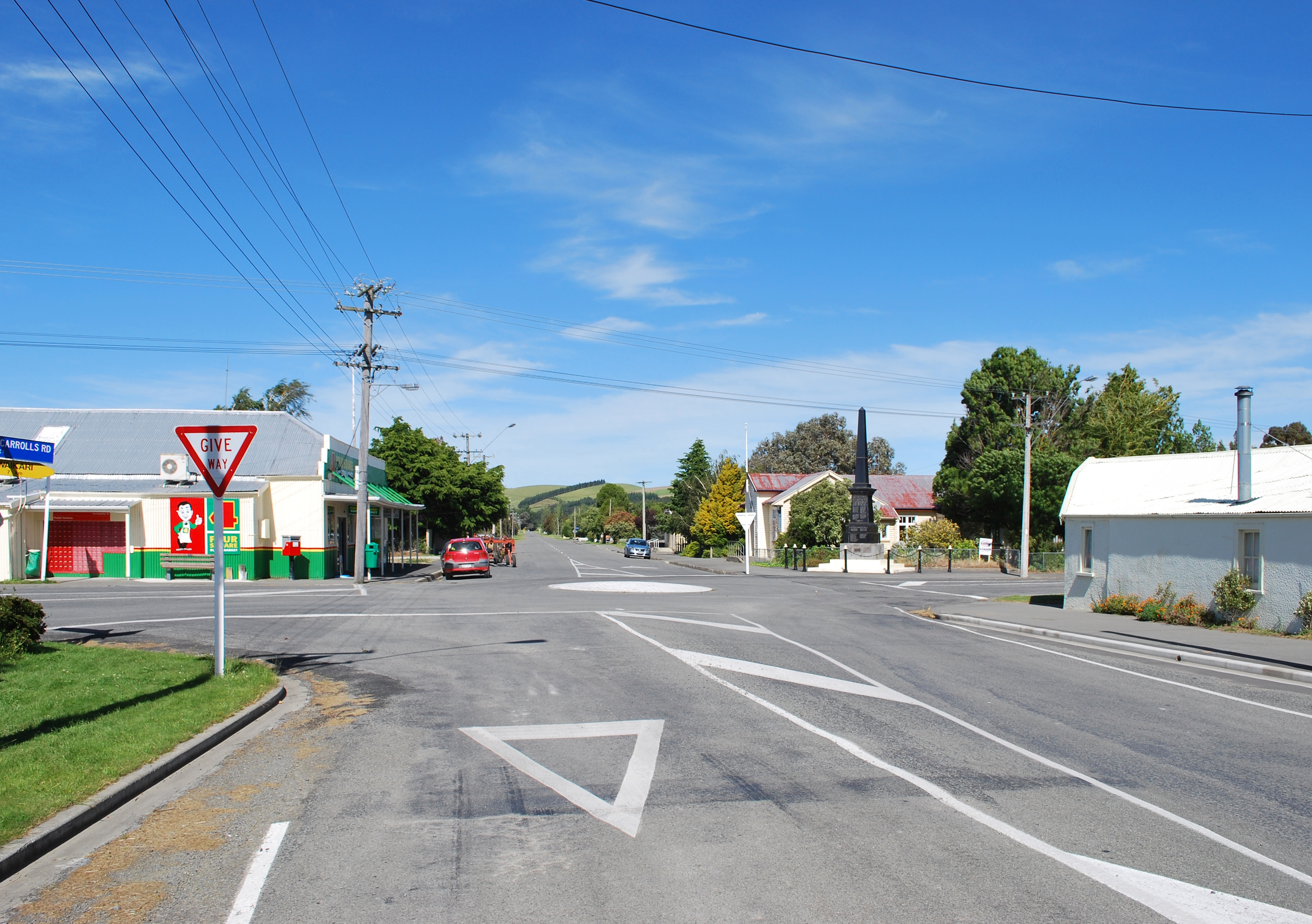
- High St, the main street of Hawarden
- Interactive map of Hawarden
- Coordinates: 42°56′S 172°38′E
- Country: New Zealand
- Region: Canterbury
- Territorial authority: Hurunui District
- Ward: West Ward
- Electorates: Kaikōura; Te Tai Tonga

Government
  - Territorial Authority: Hurunui District Council
  - Regional council: Environment Canterbury
  - Mayor of Hurunui: Marie Black
  - Kaikoura MP: Stuart Smith
  - Te Tai Tonga MP: Tākuta Ferris

Area
  - Total: 0.67 km^{2} (0.26 sq mi)

Population (June 2025)
  - Total: 240
  - Density: 360/km^{2} (930/sq mi)
- Time zone: UTC+12 (New Zealand Standard Time)
  - Summer (DST): UTC+13 (New Zealand Daylight Time)
- Postcode: 7385

Hawarden is a small town in the Canterbury region of New Zealand's South Island. It is located near Waikari, just off State Highway 7.

From 15 December 1884 until 15 January 1978, the town was served by the Waiau Branch, a branch line railway that at one stage was planned to become the Main North Line to Nelson and Blenheim. The Weka Pass Railway restoration project once had plans to retain the line through Hawarden, but later chose to terminate their line in Waikari. Some relics of the old railway line still remain at the site of Hawarden's railway station.

The town is home to the Flaxmere Gardens and is located in a scenic area near the Lake Sumner Forest Park, with a number of other lakes also in the vicinity.

== Demographics ==
Hawarden is described by Stats NZ as a rural settlement and covers 0.67 km^{2} (0.26 sq mi). It had an estimated population of 240 as of June 2025, with a population density of 358 people per km^{2}. Hawarden is part of the larger Upper Hurunui statistical area.

Historical population for Hawarden
Year	Pop.	±% p.a.
2006	201	—
2013	219	+1.23%
2018	225	+0.54%
2023	240	+1.30%
The 2006 population is for a larger area of 0.98 km^{2}. Source:

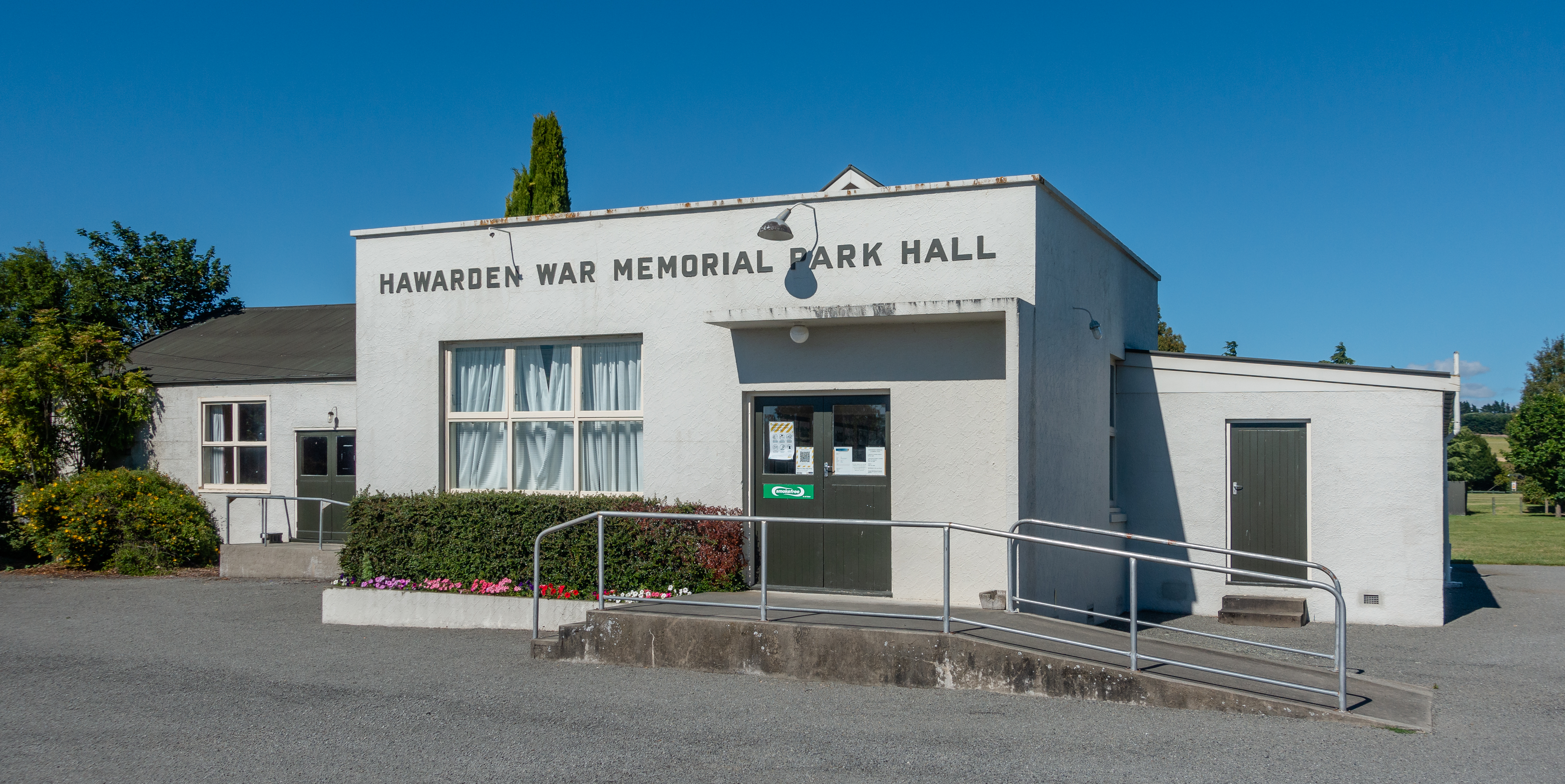
Hawarden Community War Memorial Hall

Hawarden had a population of 240 in the 2023 New Zealand census, an increase of 15 people (6.7%) since the 2018 census, and an increase of 21 people (9.6%) since the 2013 census. There were 123 males and 114 females in 117 dwellings. 3.8% of people identified as LGBTIQ+. The median age was 47.9 years (compared with 38.1 years nationally). There were 33 people (13.8%) aged under 15 years, 30 (12.5%) aged 15 to 29, 120 (50.0%) aged 30 to 64, and 60 (25.0%) aged 65 or older.

People could identify as more than one ethnicity. The results were 91.2% European (Pākehā); 15.0% Māori; 2.5% Pasifika; 3.8% Asian; and 2.5% Middle Eastern, Latin American and African New Zealanders (MELAA). English was spoken by 98.8%, Māori by 2.5%, and other languages by 7.5%. No language could be spoken by 2.5% (e.g. too young to talk). The percentage of people born overseas was 17.5, compared with 28.8% nationally.

Religious affiliations were 21.2% Christian, 1.2% New Age, and 2.5% other religions. People who answered that they had no religion were 71.2%, and 5.0% of people did not answer the census question.

Of those at least 15 years old, 33 (15.9%) people had a bachelor's or higher degree, 108 (52.2%) had a post-high school certificate or diploma, and 63 (30.4%) people exclusively held high school qualifications. The median income was $31,600, compared with $41,500 nationally. 3 people (1.4%) earned over $100,000 compared to 12.1% nationally. The employment status of those at least 15 was 93 (44.9%) full-time, 36 (17.4%) part-time, and 3 (1.4%) unemployed.

=== Upper Hurunui statistical area ===
Upper Hurunui, which includes Hawarden and Waikari, covers 1,004.96 km^{2} (388.02 sq mi). It had an estimated population of 1,530 as of June 2025, with a population density of 1.5 people per km^{2}.

Historical population for Upper Hurunui
Year	Pop.	±% p.a.
2006	1,365	—
2013	1,425	+0.62%
2018	1,473	+0.66%
2023	1,503	+0.40%

Upper Hurunui had a population of 1,503 in the 2023 New Zealand census, an increase of 30 people (2.0%) since the 2018 census, and an increase of 78 people (5.5%) since the 2013 census. There were 771 males, 726 females, and 9 people of other genders in 636 dwellings. 2.0% of people identified as LGBTIQ+. The median age was 48.7 years (compared with 38.1 years nationally). There were 243 people (16.2%) aged under 15 years, 207 (13.8%) aged 15 to 29, 711 (47.3%) aged 30 to 64, and 342 (22.8%) aged 65 or older.

People could identify as more than one ethnicity. The results were 91.8% European (Pākehā); 8.6% Māori; 2.0% Pasifika; 2.6% Asian; 0.4% Middle Eastern, Latin American and African New Zealanders (MELAA); and 4.8% other, which includes people giving their ethnicity as "New Zealander". English was spoken by 98.4%, Māori by 1.0%, Samoan by 0.4%, and other languages by 6.4%. No language could be spoken by 1.2% (e.g. too young to talk). The percentage of people born overseas was 14.6, compared with 28.8% nationally.

Religious affiliations were 31.5% Christian, 0.2% Māori religious beliefs, 0.2% Buddhist, 0.2% New Age, and 0.8% other religions. People who answered that they had no religion were 57.7%, and 9.4% of people did not answer the census question.

Of those at least 15 years old, 186 (14.8%) people had a bachelor's or higher degree, 759 (60.2%) had a post-high school certificate or diploma, and 318 (25.2%) people exclusively held high school qualifications. The median income was $33,600, compared with $41,500 nationally. 84 people (6.7%) earned over $100,000 compared to 12.1% nationally. The employment status of those at least 15 was 627 (49.8%) full-time, 228 (18.1%) part-time, and 15 (1.2%) unemployed.

== Education ==
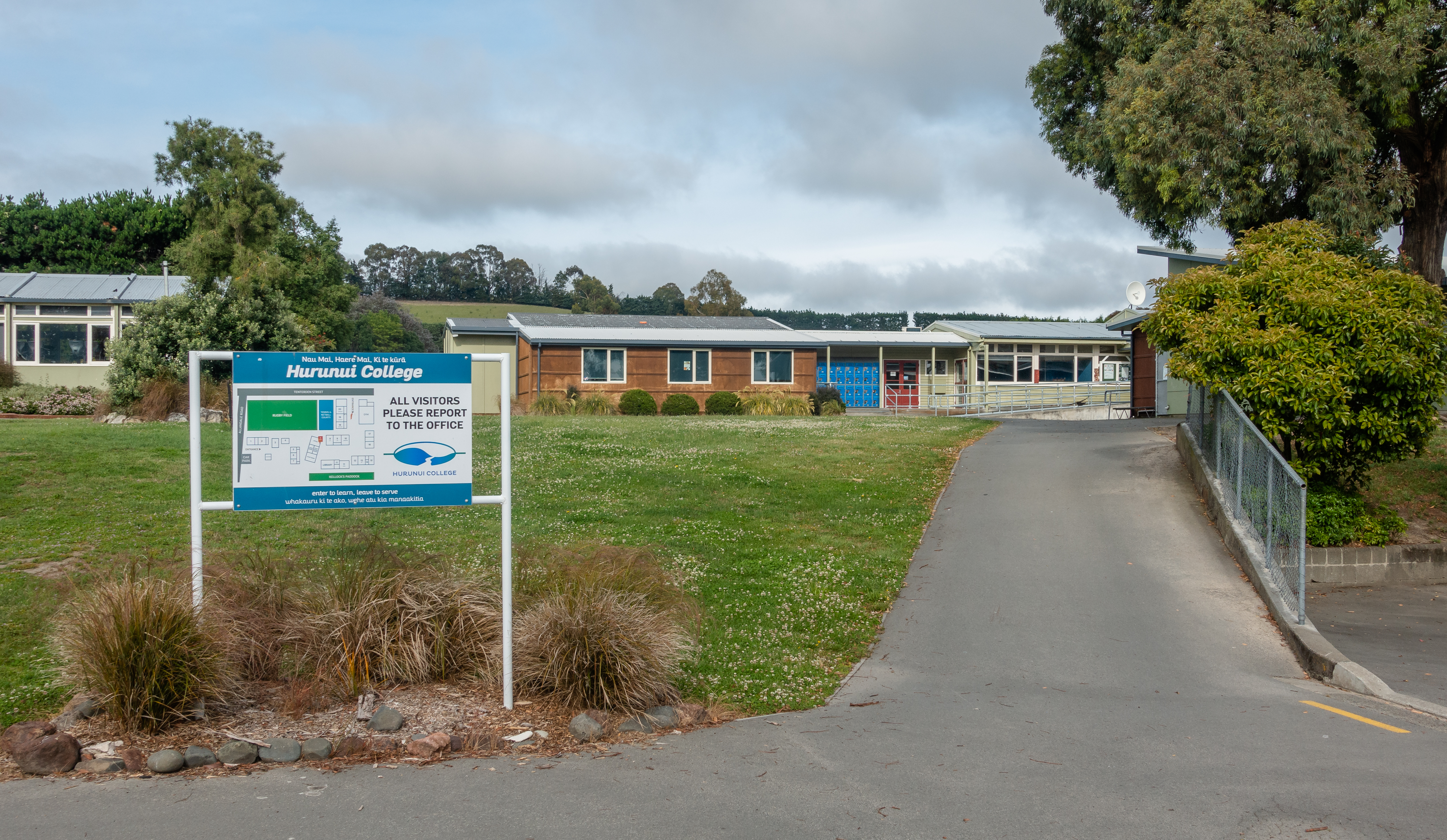
Hurunui College

Hurunui College is a co-educational state area school for Year 1 to 13 students, with a roll of 190 as of July 2026. It opened in 1927 as Hawarden Consolidated School. It became Hawarden District High School in 1930, then Hawarden Area School in 1977. It took the name Hurunui College in 2001 as it serves a larger area than Hawarden.

== Notable people ==
- Sally Brooker, inorganic chemist
- Joe Earl (born 1952), Olympic rower
- James Wattie, founder of Wattie's
