= Hurunui District =

- Territorial authority district
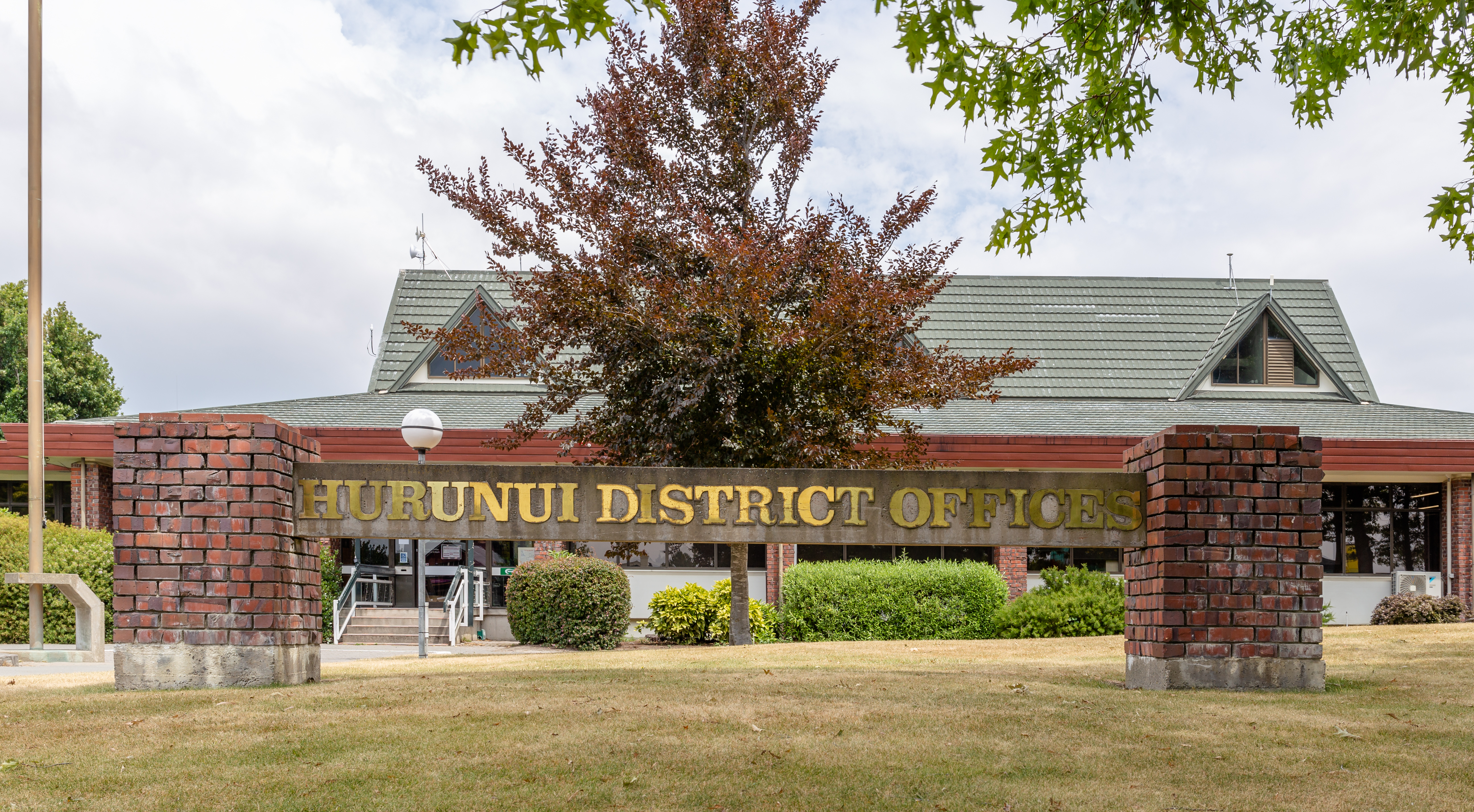
- Hurunui District Offices in Amberley

- Hurunui district in the South Island
- Coordinates: 43°09′07″S 172°43′44″E
- Country: New Zealand
- Region: Canterbury
- Wards: West; East; South
- Formed: 1989
- Seat: Amberley

Government
  - Mayor: Marie Black
  - Deputy Mayor: Vince Daly
  - Territorial authority: Hurunui District Council

Area
  - Total: 8,640.96 km^{2} (3,336.29 sq mi)

Population (June 2025)
  - Total: 14,350
  - Density: 1.661/km^{2} (4.301/sq mi)
- Time zone: UTC+12 (NZST)
  - Summer (DST): UTC+13 (NZDT)
- Postcode(s): Map of postcodes
- Website: www.hurunui.govt.nz

Hurunui District is a territorial local government district within the Canterbury Region on the east coast of New Zealand's South Island, north of Christchurch. It stretches from the east coast to the Main Divide. Its land area is 8,640.96 square kilometres (3,336.29 sq mi).

== Local government ==
During the period, 1853 to 1876, the area north of the Hurunui River was administered as part of the Nelson Province. After the abolition of the provinces in 1876, the Amuri and Cheviot counties were formed. In the 1989 local government reforms, these counties were merged with Hurunui County to form the present district. The current district mayor is Marie Black, who was elected in 2019 upon the retirement of the previous mayor Winton Dalley.

== Population ==
Hurunui District covers 8,640.96 km^{2} (3,336.29 sq mi) and had an estimated population of 14,350 as of June 2025, with a population density of 1.7 people per km^{2}.

Historical population
Year	Pop.	±% p.a.
2006	10,476	—
2013	11,529	+1.38%
2018	12,558	+1.72%
2023	13,608	+1.62%

Hurunui District had a population of 13,608 in the 2023 New Zealand census, an increase of 1,050 people (8.4%) since the 2018 census, and an increase of 2,079 people (18.0%) since the 2013 census. There were 6,942 males, 6,636 females and 33 people of other genders in 5,814 dwellings. 2.4% of people identified as LGBTIQ+. The median age was 46.2 years (compared with 38.1 years nationally). There were 2,412 people (17.7%) aged under 15 years, 1,809 (13.3%) aged 15 to 29, 6,327 (46.5%) aged 30 to 64, and 3,063 (22.5%) aged 65 or older.

People could identify as more than one ethnicity. The results were 90.5% European (Pākehā); 10.1% Māori; 1.3% Pasifika; 4.7% Asian; 0.9% Middle Eastern, Latin American and African New Zealanders (MELAA); and 3.7% other, which includes people giving their ethnicity as "New Zealander". English was spoken by 97.8%, Māori language by 1.7%, Samoan by 0.2% and other languages by 7.1%. No language could be spoken by 1.7% (e.g. too young to talk). New Zealand Sign Language was known by 0.4%. The percentage of people born overseas was 17.5, compared with 28.8% nationally.

Religious affiliations were 30.3% Christian, 0.5% Hindu, 0.2% Islam, 0.3% Māori religious beliefs, 0.3% Buddhist, 0.5% New Age, 0.1% Jewish, and 1.1% other religions. People who answered that they had no religion were 58.5%, and 8.4% of people did not answer the census question.

Of those at least 15 years old, 1,488 (13.3%) people had a bachelor's or higher degree, 6,384 (57.0%) had a post-high school certificate or diploma, and 2,853 (25.5%) people exclusively held high school qualifications. The median income was $37,100, compared with $41,500 nationally. 912 people (8.1%) earned over $100,000 compared to 12.1% nationally. The employment status of those at least 15 was that 5,562 (49.7%) people were employed full-time, 1,974 (17.6%) were part-time, and 162 (1.4%) were unemployed.

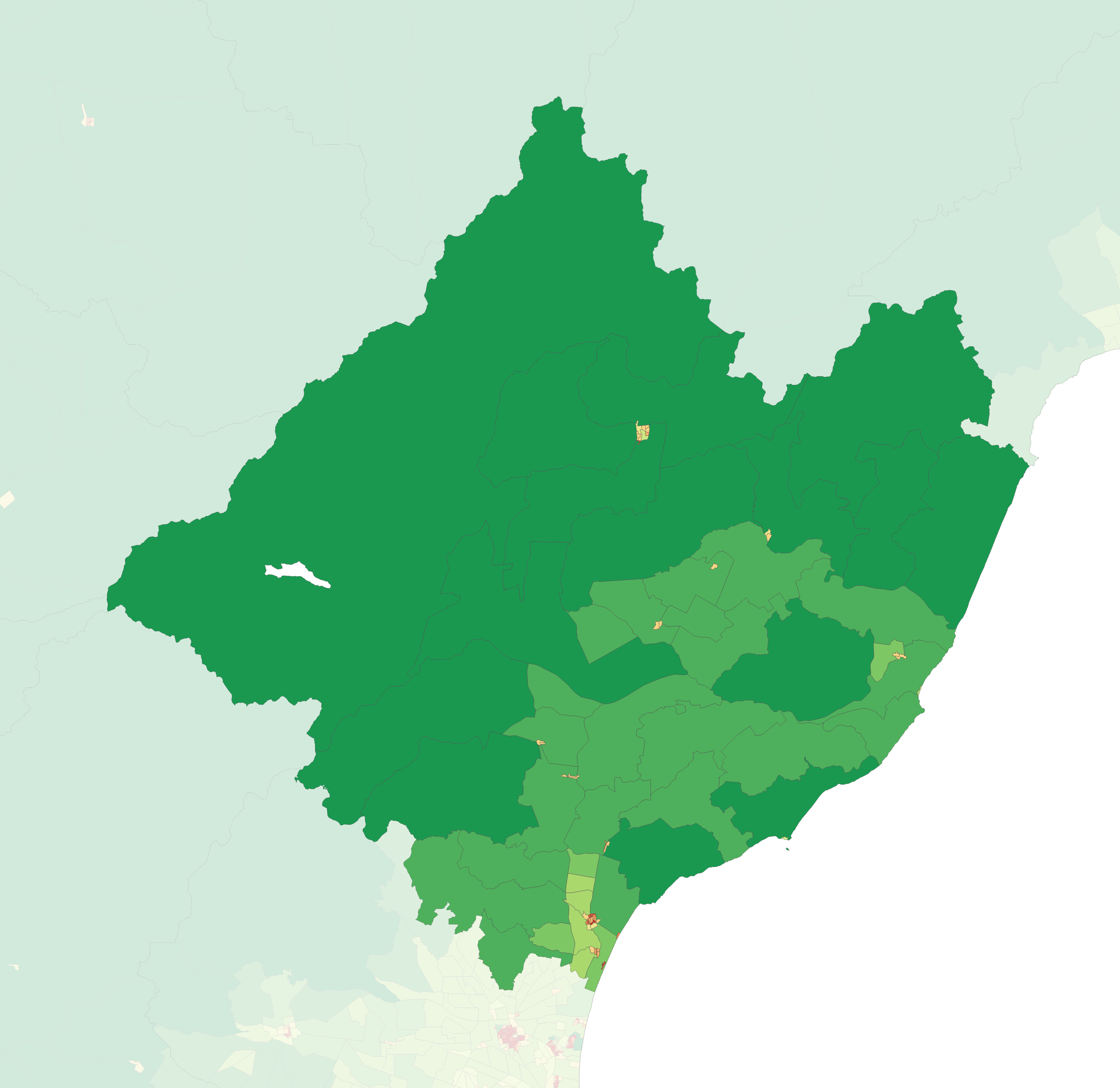
Population density in the 2023 census

Individual wards
Name	Area (km^{2})	Population	Density (per km^{2})	Dwellings	Median age	Median income
West Ward	6,457.64	5,088	0.79	2,322	42.2 years	$40,000
East Ward	1,686.36	2,685	1.59	1,152	46.7 years	$36,100
South Ward	496.96	5,835	11.74	2,340	50.0 years	$35,000
New Zealand					38.1 years	$41,500

=== Urban areas and settlements ===
The Hurunui district has two towns with a population over 1,000: Amberley and Hanmer Springs. Together they are home to 27.6% of the district's population.

Urban area	Population (June 2025)	% of district
Amberley	2,870	20.0%
Hanmer Springs	1,090	7.6%
Leithfield	650	4.5%
Leithfield Beach	410	2.9%
Culverden	360	2.5%
Cheviot	410	2.9%
Waipara	340	2.4%
Waiau	270	1.9%
Waikari	290	2.0%
Hawarden	240	1.7%

Other settlements and localities in the district include the following:

- East Hurunui Ward:
  - Cheviot Sub-Division:^{a}
    - Blythe Valley
    - Caverhill
    - Cheviot
    - Claverley
    - Conway Flat
    - Domett
    - Ferniehurst
    - Gore Bay
    - Hawkswood
    - Hundalee
    - Hurunui Mouth
    - Leamington
    - Mina
    - Napenape
    - Nonoti
    - Parnassus
    - Phoebe
    - Port Robinson
    - Spotswood
    - Medina
    - Beckenham Hills
  - Glenmark Sub-Division:^{b}
    - Greta Valley
    - Motunau
    - Motunau Beach
    - Omihi
    - Scargill
    - Spye
    - Waipara
    - Stonyhurst
    - Davaar
- West Hurunui Ward:
  - Amuri Sub-Division:^{c}
    - Balmoral
    - Culverden
    - Mount Lyford^{2}
    - Mouse Point
    - Pahau
    - Rotherham
    - Waiau
    - Cheddar Valley
    - Greenbrae
    - Ngawiro
    - Red Post Corner
    - Woodchester
    - Marble Point
  - Hurunui Sub-Division:^{c}
    - Hawarden
    - Horsley Down
    - Hurunui
    - Masons Flat
    - Medbury
    - Pyramid Valley
    - The Peaks
    - Virginia
    - Waikari
    - Weka Pass
    - Lake Sumner
  - Hanmer Springs Sub-Division:^{d}
    - Boyle Village
    - Hanmer Springs^{2}
    - Lewis Pass
    - Engineers Camp
- South Hurunui Ward:
  - Amberley Sub-Division:^{e}
    - Amberley^{1}
    - Amberley Beach
    - Balcairn
    - Broomfield
    - Glasnevin
    - Leithfield
    - Leithfield Beach
    - Greneys Road
    - Teviotdale
