= Weka Pass =

Locality in Hurunui District, Canterbury Region, New Zealand

Coordinates: 43.007°S 172.704°E

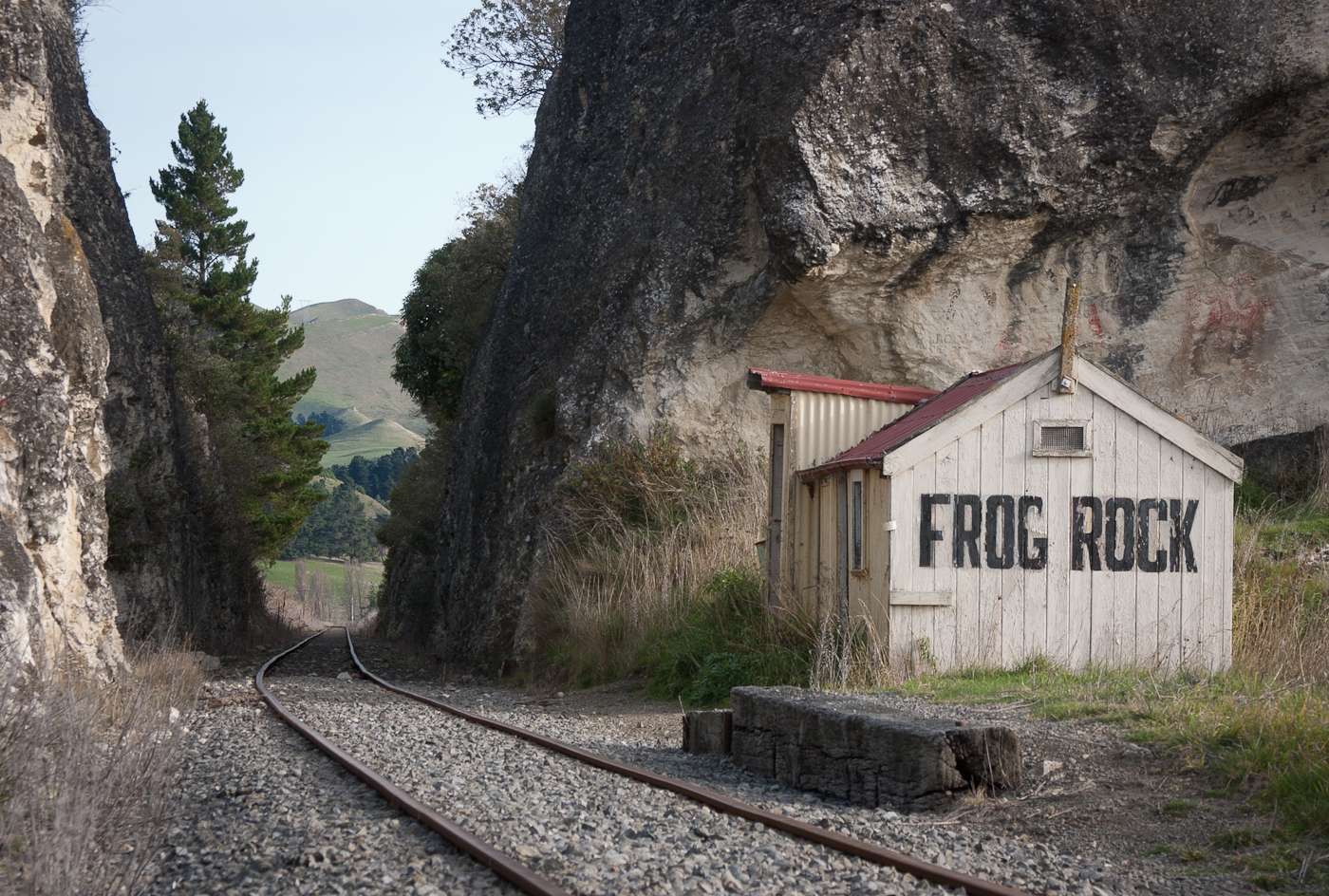
Frog Rock

Weka Pass is a locality in the northern Canterbury region of New Zealand's South Island between the towns of Waipara and Waikari.

The Waipara River cut the Weka Pass by wearing down the soft limestone and mudstone in the area. Erosion has created a number of distinctive limestone formations in the pass, which are known by descriptive names such as Frog Rock and The Seal. The surrounding area is known for its wine.

Māori rock art can be found under a limestone overhang, and it is now the prime attraction of the Weka Pass Historic Park. Māori first explored the area approximately a millennium ago and used the limestone overhang for shelter. Early European explorers utilized the overhang for the same purpose. The art cave can be visited via a 2.25 km hike, but the ancient art was painted over in 1930, with the intention of preserving the markings for future generations. Images and reproductions of the original, untouched cave paintings can be seen at the Canterbury Museum in Christchurch.

State Highway 7 runs through the Weka Pass, and so does a railway line. This railway was established in 1882 and although originally intended to be part of the Main North Line from Christchurch to Nelson and Blenheim, the main line ultimately took a coastal route northwards from Waipara and the line through the Weka Pass became part of the Waiau Branch. This branch line operated until 15 January 1978, and the section through the Weka Pass has been saved by a preservation group, the Weka Pass Railway. It is now a restored railway which primarily serves tourists.
