= Waiau Branch =

Branch line railway in New Zealand

Overview
- Status: Partly Closed
- Owner: Railways Department
- Locale: Canterbury, New Zealand
- Termini: Waipara; Waiau
- Stations: 10

Service
- Type: Heavy Rail
- System: New Zealand Government Railways (NZGR)
- Operator(s): Railways Department

History
- Opened: 15 December 1919
- Closed: 15 January 1978

Technical
- Line length: 66.55 km
- Number of tracks: Single
- Character: Rural
- Track gauge: 3 ft 6 in (1,067 mm)

Map

The Waiau Branch was a branch line railway in the northern Canterbury region of New Zealand's South Island. Known as the Great Northern Railway for its first few decades of life, the Waiau Branch was seen as part of a main line north but was ultimately superseded by a coastal route. Opened in stages from 1882 to 1919, the line closed in 1978 but a portion has been retained as the Weka Pass Railway.

== Construction ==
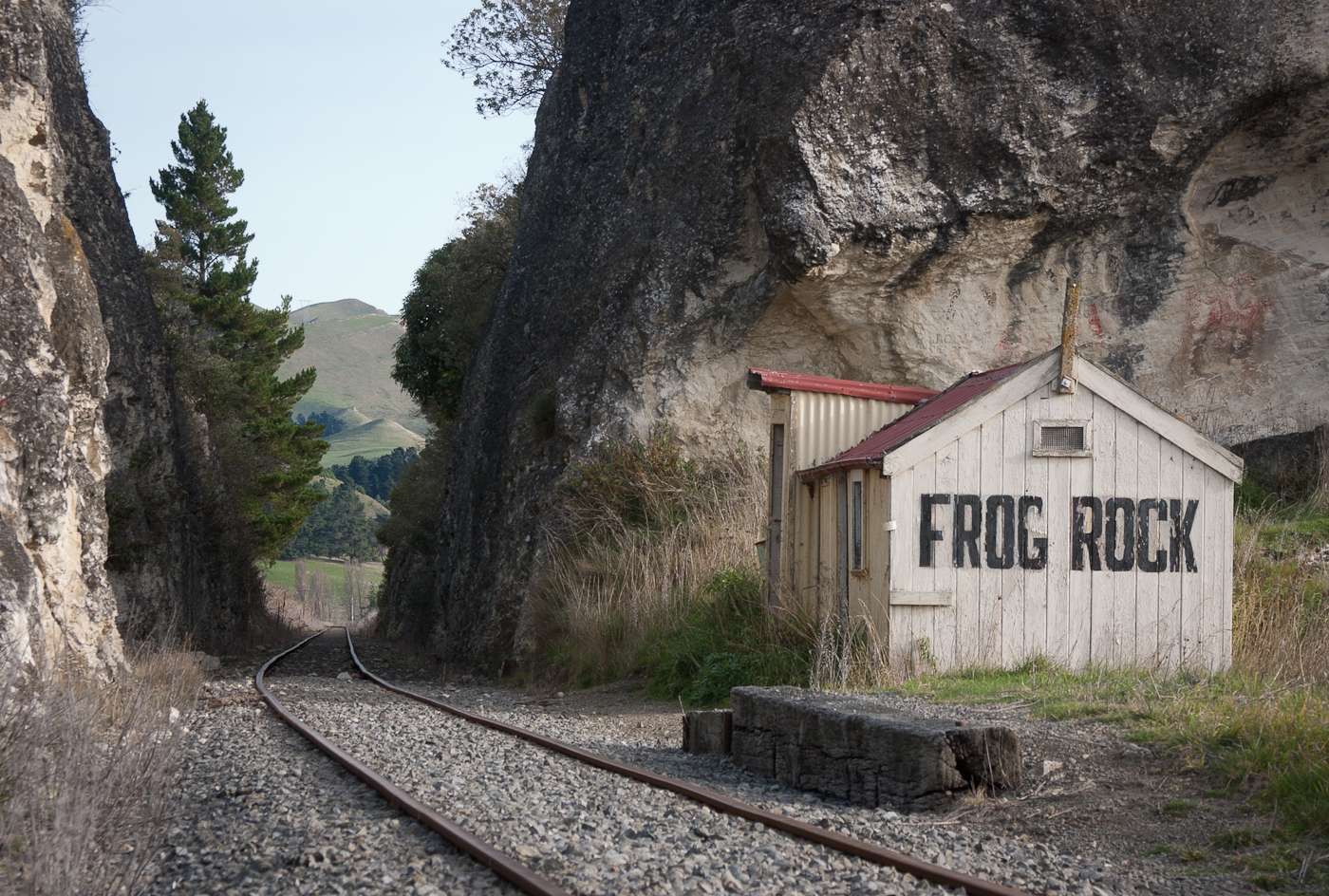
Frog Rock.

During the 1870s, significant debates motivated by regional interests took place regarding the most desirable route for a railway from Canterbury to the West Coast, Nelson, and Marlborough. A number of these plans involved lines that would have in some way incorporated the route of what became the Waiau Branch, and when it was built, it was seen as an integral part of the Main North Line.

Despite an 1879 report favouring a coastal route via Kaikōura as the line north, the inland route was initially chosen and construction work soon began. Its junction with the Main North Line (though not realised by anyone at the time as it was intended to be the main line itself) would be in Waipara, and the section to Waikari was opened on 6 April 1882. Another report in 1883 also favoured the coastal route, but construction of the Waiau route proceeded and the section to Medbury opened on 15 September 1884, with Culverden reached on 8 February 1886.

Construction halted once Culverden was reached, and it became the northern terminus for the main line along the east coast of the South Island. One notable proposal at this time involved extending the line via Hanmer Springs to Tophouse, and then building two routes from there, one to Nelson and one down the Wairau River valley to Blenheim. Another proposal involved building a line across the Southern Alps to Reefton, and accessing Nelson and Marlborough via a line through the Buller Gorge. The Reefton route remained a possibility for access to the West Coast until the Otira Tunnel was built, and the route to Nelson and Blenheim via Tophouse remained under consideration until the 1930s.

Despite many proposals, the railhead remained in Culverden for a number of decades. In 1902, the Culverden – Waiau Railway Extension League was formed, and it created enough pressure to encourage a new survey of a route from Culverden to Waiau in 1908. It wasn't until 10 June 1914, however, that work on this extension finally began, and despite delays, work continued through World War I, with the line opened to Waiau on 15 December 1919. It was then proposed that the line could be extended to Kaikōura and then through to Marlborough, and some formation was built, but this work ultimately ground to a halt and the line's terminus remained in Waiau. The line effectively became a branch of the Main North Line when approval was given to extend the Parnassus Branch up the coast as the main line; this was completed in 1945.

== Stations ==
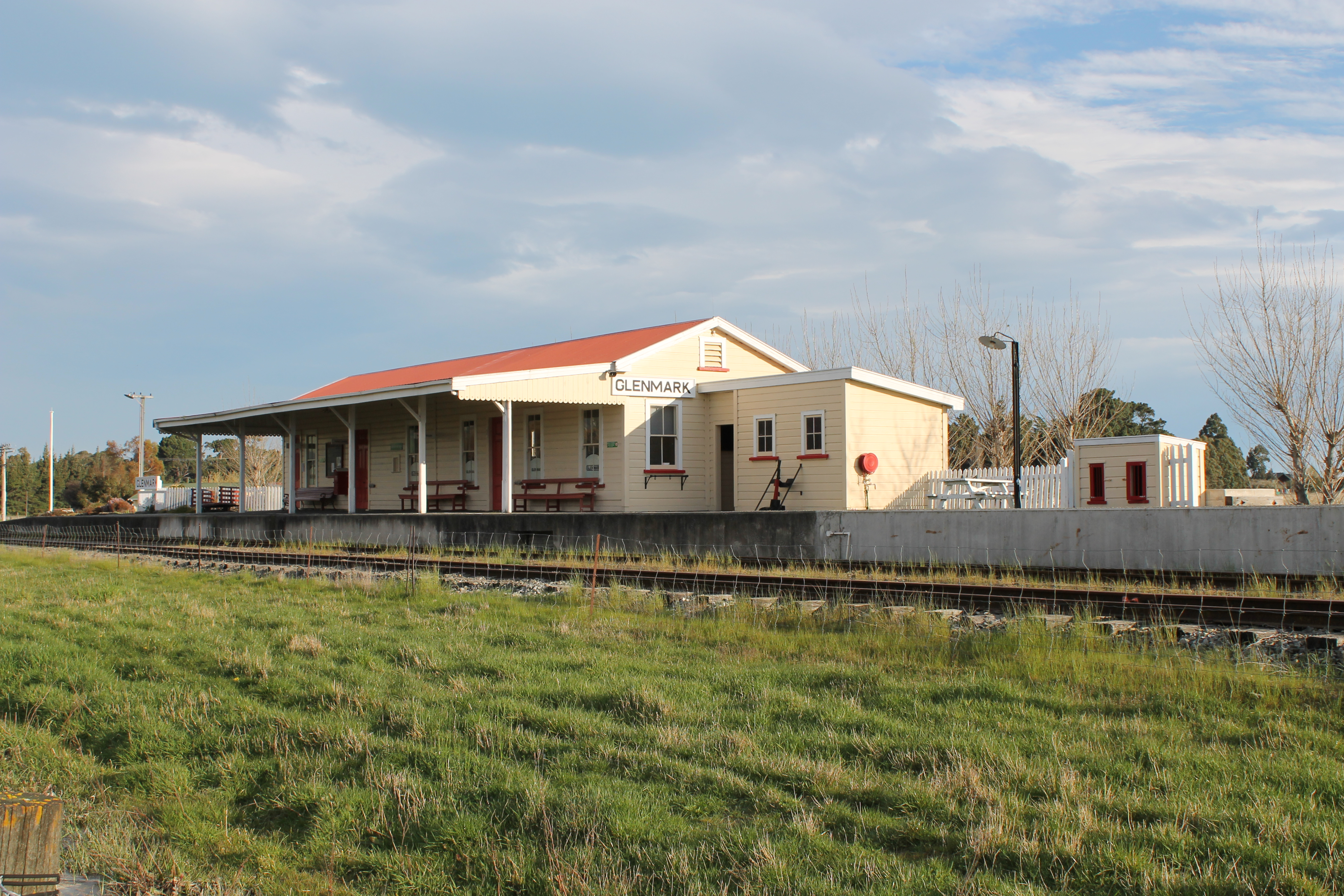
Glenmark Station in Waipara

The following stations were located on the Waiau Branch (in brackets is the distance in kilometres from Waipara):

- Waikari (14.67 km)
- Hawarden (21.43 km)
- Medbury (26.75 km)
- Balmoral (34.7 km)
- Pahau (40.98 km)
- Culverden (45.95 km)
- Achray (54.34 km)
- Rotherham (57.32 km)
- Waiau (66.55 km)

== Operation ==
As part of the main east coast line, the Waiau Branch was a busy railway by the standards of country New Zealand branch lines. The Culverden Express began not long after the line was opened and was the most important train in North Canterbury at the time. The express was supplemented by multiple mixed trains that carried both goods and passengers and ran to a slower schedule. In 1919, a goods train was added to the schedule and the passenger train between Christchurch and Culverden operated twice daily; these services operated beyond Culverden to Waiau only thrice weekly. Trains sometimes had to be banked through Weka Pass, requiring an engine shed in Waikari, and locomotive depots were established in Waipara, Culverden, and Waiau.

In 1907, the New Zealand Railways Department under the Railways Road Services Branch, introduced a bus connection from Culverden to the popular tourist location of Hanmer Springs, and by the 1920s, the policy of the New Zealand Railways Department was to actively encourage the bus services, which had been expanded. This led the passenger numbers on the line to decline from 20,000 in 1914 to just 3,000 yearly when passenger services were entirely cancelled on 29 January 1939.

Freight, however, remained strong on the line. Extensive timber resources in the area led to a significant quantity of traffic, and the annual Molesworth Station muster required additional trains to transport the large amount of livestock, with these special services operating well into the 1960s despite the widespread demise of the transportation of livestock throughout the country. The branch was dieselised in 1968, and at this stage, despite the relaxation of laws and removal of subsidies that had benefited rail, it was still necessary to run two trains daily. In July 1975, a major storm severely damaged pine growth in the Balmoral State Forest, and the resulting timber that had to be transported resulted in a surge for the line. Multiple trains were required to run daily, sometimes hauled by two locomotives, and this traffic lasted for two years. When it finally ceased in late 1977, the line suddenly became uneconomic. No other traffic existed that was sufficient to justify the line's continued existence, and closure occurred on 15 January 1978.

== The branch today ==
A union ban led to the track of the Waiau Branch remaining in place for a number of years after the line's closure, which gave locals and railway enthusiasts enough time to form the Weka Pass Railway and preserve the first 13 km of the branch line. The rest of the track to Waiau has now been removed, though this was not completed until 1991, and a number of remnants remain on the abandoned route. Much of the line's formation is still visible, and a part of it has been used as a walkway in Waikari, though it does not connect with the Weka Pass Railway's terminus in the town. A few station shelters and goods sheds have been relocated for use on farms near the line's former route, and other relics such as loading banks, station platforms, and pieces of rail can be found at the site of some old stations.
