= Waikari =

Town in Canterbury, New Zealand

- town
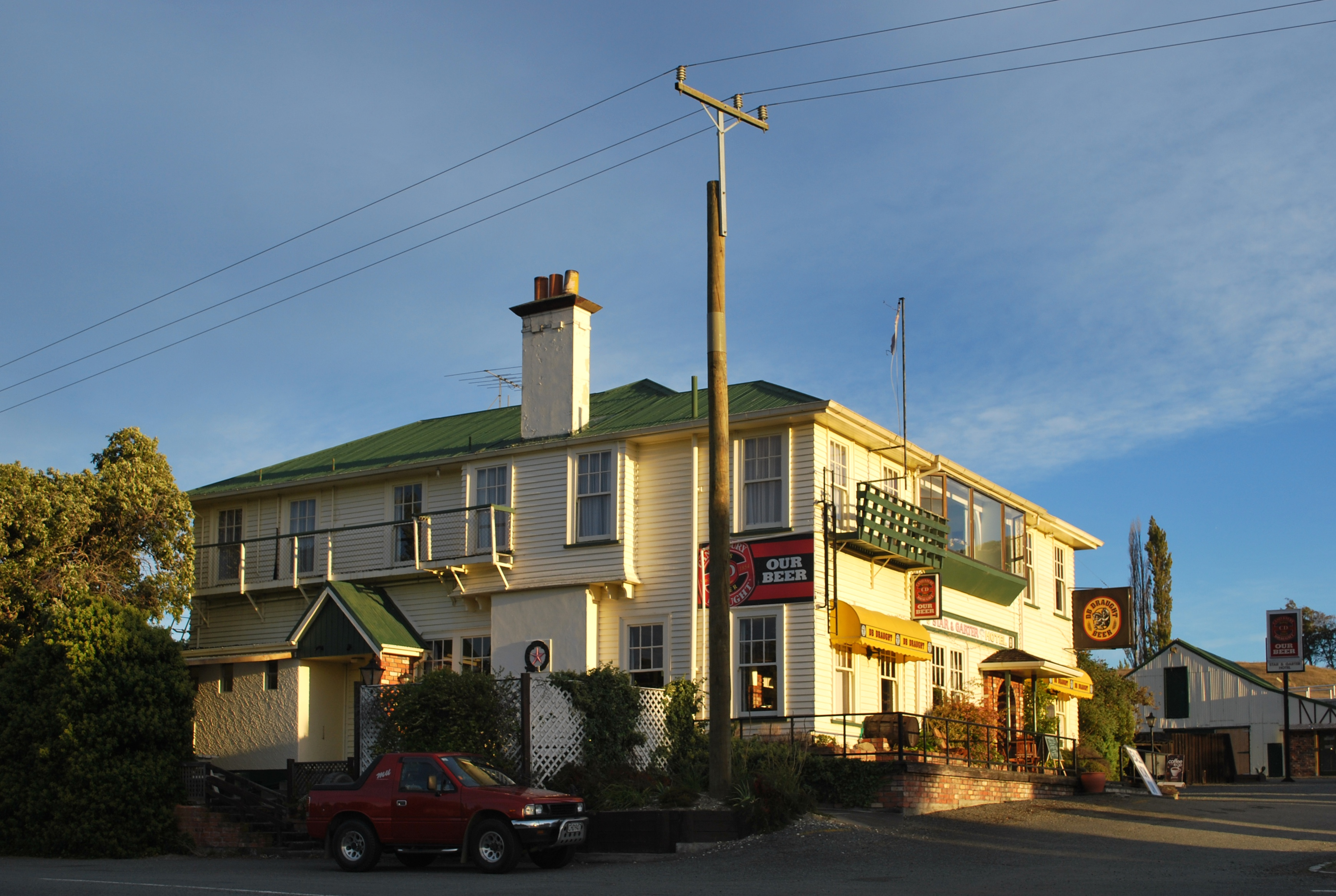
- The Star and Garter Hotel in Waikari
- Interactive map of Waikari
- Coordinates: 42°58′S 172°41′E
- Country: New Zealand
- Region: Canterbury
- Territorial authority: Hurunui District
- Ward: West Ward
- Electorates: Kaikōura; Te Tai Tonga

Government
  - Territorial Authority: Hurunui District Council
  - Regional council: Environment Canterbury
  - Mayor of Hurunui: Marie Black
  - Kaikoura MP: Stuart Smith
  - Te Tai Tonga MP: Tākuta Ferris

Area
  - Total: 0.79 km^{2} (0.31 sq mi)

Population (June 2025)
  - Total: 290
  - Density: 370/km^{2} (950/sq mi)
- Time zone: UTC+12 (New Zealand Standard Time)
  - Summer (DST): UTC+13 (New Zealand Daylight Time)
- Postcode: 7420

Waikari is a small town in the Canterbury region of New Zealand's South Island.

Its Anglican parish church is the Church of Ascension, 79 Princes Street, Waikari, where William Orange was vicar in the 1920s.

The New Zealand Ministry for Culture and Heritage gives a translation of "dig for water" for Waikari.

Waikari is located on State Highway 7 near the Weka Pass and was served by the Waiau Branch railway from 6 April 1882 until its closure on 15 January 1978. The section of the railway through the Weka Pass has been retained by the Weka Pass Railway and preserved trains operate between Waipara and Waikari.

A town water supply was first put to ratepayers in 1956 and the water supply and sewage works were completed in 1966. Fortnightly rubbish collection was in place in Waikari by 1973. In 1984, Waikari (and Hawarden) became the last towns in North Canterbury to be switched to an automatic telephone exchange.

The town is also located near the site of Māori cave art and rock drawings in the Weka Pass Reserve.

== Demographics ==
Waikari is described by Stats NZ as a rural settlement and covers 0.79 km^{2} (0.31 sq mi). It had an estimated population of 290 as of June 2025, with a population density of 367 people per km^{2}. Waikari is part of the larger Upper Hurunui statistical area.

Historical population
Year	Pop.	±% p.a.
2006	252	—
2013	264	+0.67%
2018	267	+0.23%
2023	285	+1.31%

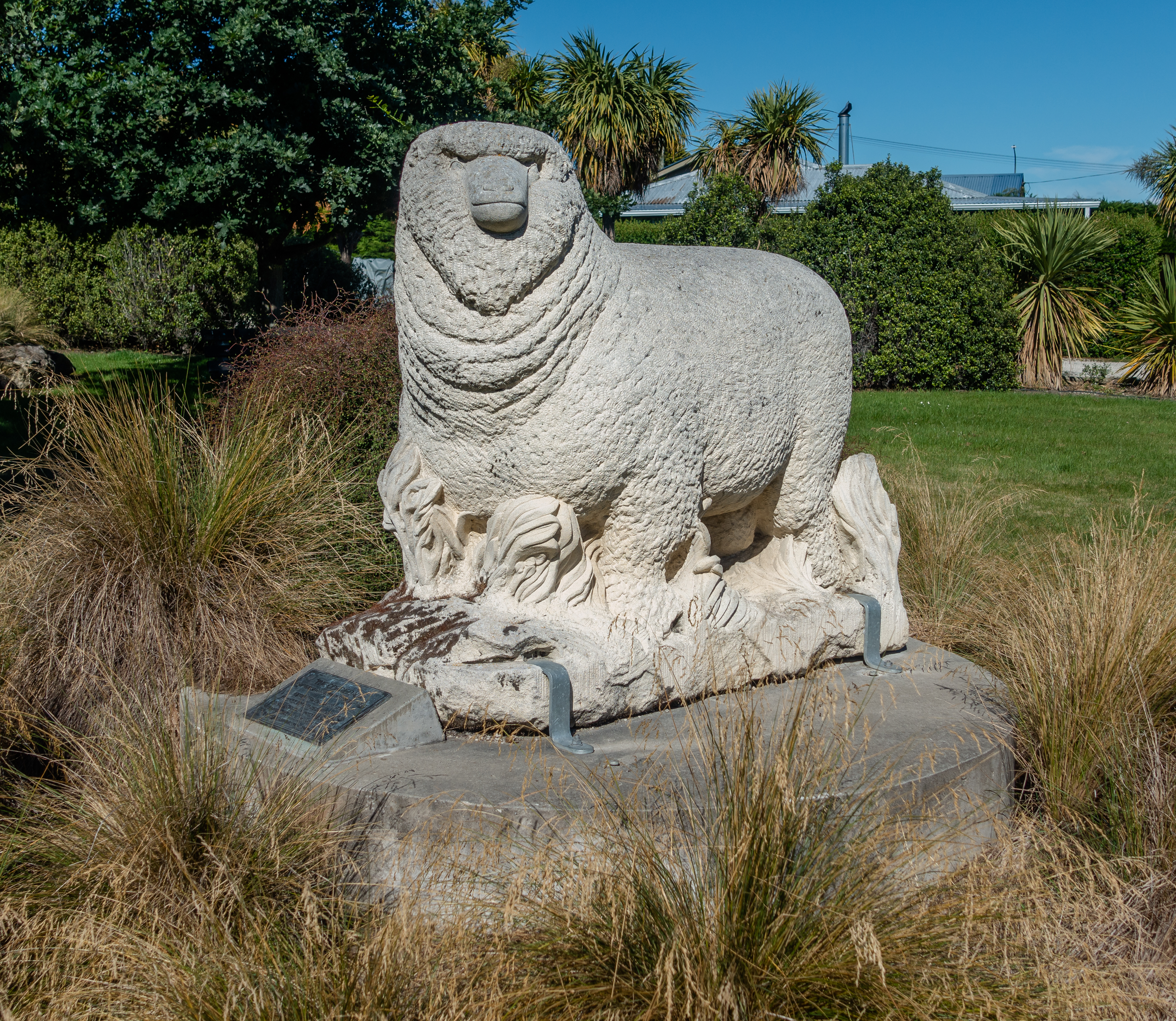
The Corriedale sheep sculpture

Waikari had a population of 285 in the 2023 New Zealand census, an increase of 18 people (6.7%) since the 2018 census, and an increase of 21 people (8.0%) since the 2013 census. There were 147 males, 135 females, and 3 people of other genders in 135 dwellings. 2.1% of people identified as LGBTIQ+. The median age was 57.5 years (compared with 38.1 years nationally). There were 30 people (10.5%) aged under 15 years, 33 (11.6%) aged 15 to 29, 120 (42.1%) aged 30 to 64, and 96 (33.7%) aged 65 or older.

People could identify as more than one ethnicity. The results were 90.5% European (Pākehā), 8.4% Māori, 6.3% Pasifika, and 8.4% other, which includes people giving their ethnicity as "New Zealander". English was spoken by 97.9%, Māori by 1.1%, Samoan by 2.1%, and other languages by 4.2%. No language could be spoken by 1.1% (e.g. too young to talk). The percentage of people born overseas was 11.6, compared with 28.8% nationally.

Religious affiliations were 32.6% Christian, and 1.1% other religions. People who answered that they had no religion were 57.9%, and 7.4% of people did not answer the census question.

Of those at least 15 years old, 24 (9.4%) people had a bachelor's or higher degree, 144 (56.5%) had a post-high school certificate or diploma, and 84 (32.9%) people exclusively held high school qualifications. The median income was $25,700, compared with $41,500 nationally. 9 people (3.5%) earned over $100,000 compared to 12.1% nationally. The employment status of those at least 15 was 84 (32.9%) full-time, 42 (16.5%) part-time, and 3 (1.2%) unemployed.

== Education ==
Waikari School is a co-educational state primary school for Year 1 to 8 students, with a roll of 35 as of July 2026. It opened in 1858.

== Notable people ==
- Derek Quigley, politician
