= Waipara =

Town in Canterbury, New Zealand

- Settlement
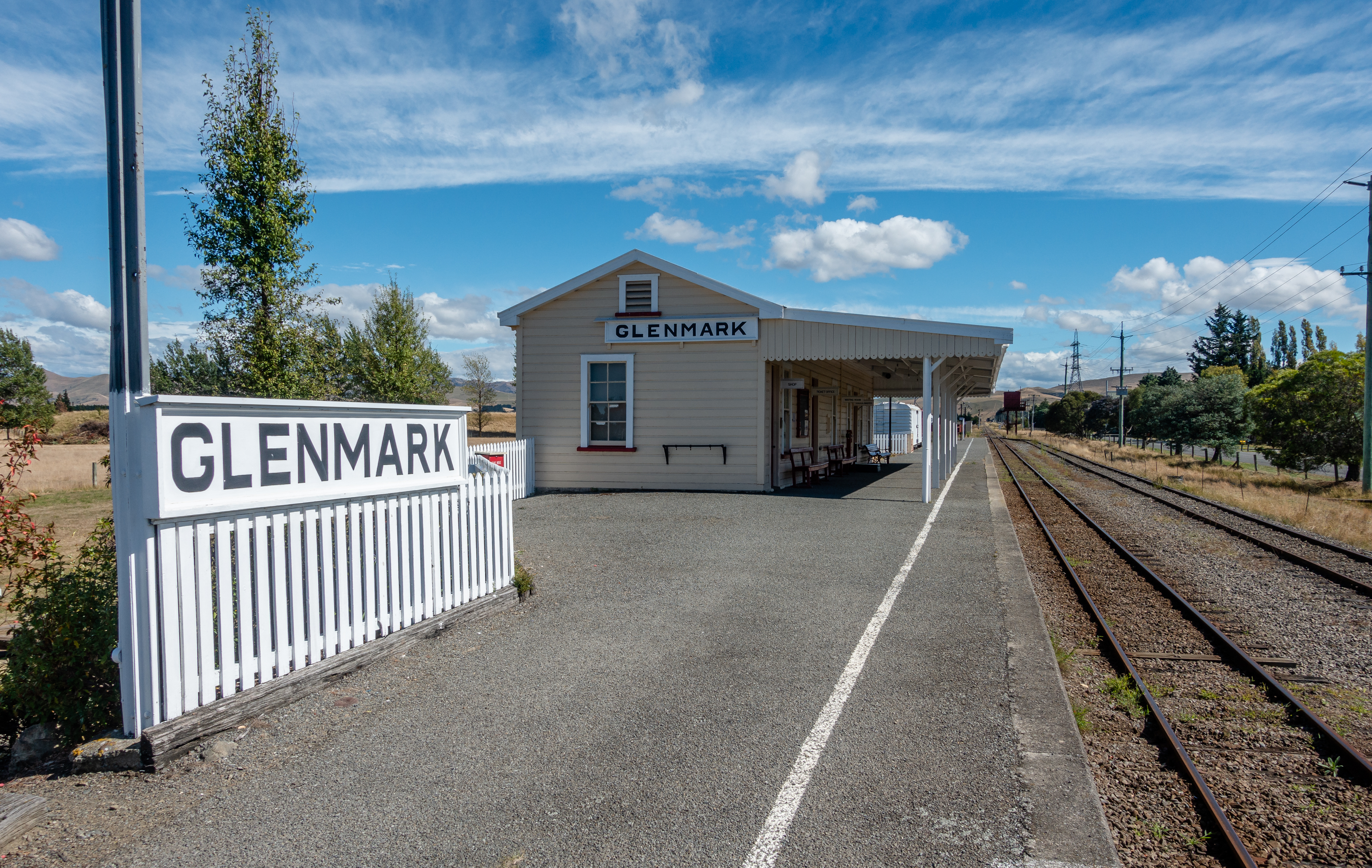
- Glenmark Train Station
- Interactive map of Waipara
- Coordinates: 43°04′S 172°45′E
- Country: New Zealand
- Region: Canterbury
- Territorial authority: Hurunui District
- Ward: East Ward
- Electorates: Kaikōura; Te Tai Tonga

Government
  - Territorial Authority: Hurunui District Council
  - Regional council: Environment Canterbury
  - Mayor of Hurunui: Marie Black
  - Kaikōura MP: Stuart Smith
  - Te Tai Tonga MP: Tākuta Ferris

Area
  - Total: 0.59 km^{2} (0.23 sq mi)

Population (June 2025)
  - Total: 340
  - Density: 580/km^{2} (1,500/sq mi)
- Time zone: UTC+12 (New Zealand Standard Time)
  - Summer (DST): UTC+13 (New Zealand Daylight Time)

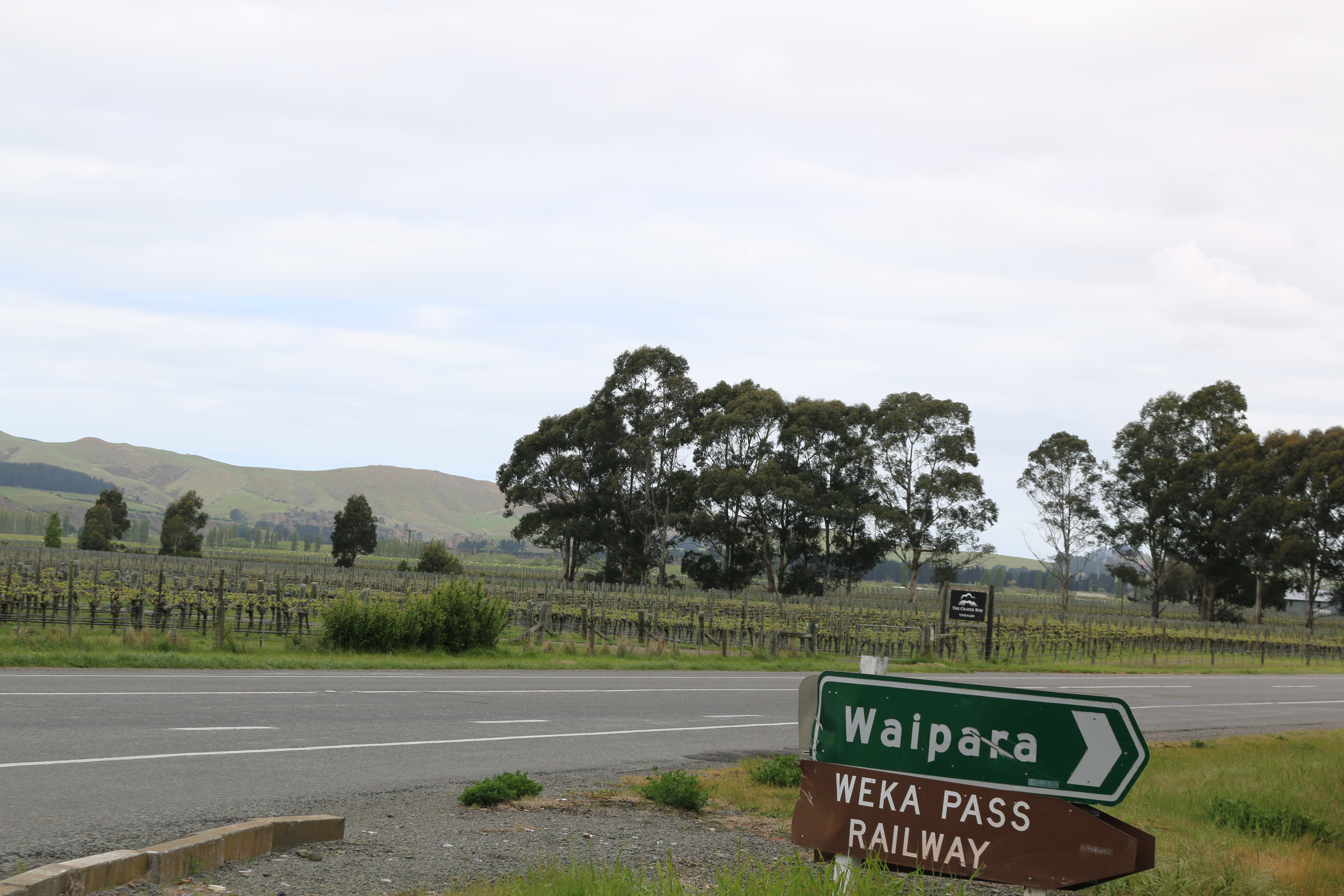
Waipara, surrounded by vineyards

Waipara is a wine and tourism district in Canterbury, New Zealand, on the banks of the Waipara River. Its name translates to "muddy water", wai meaning water and para meaning mud.

It is at the junction of state highways 1 and 7, on the Alpine Pacific Touring Route. It is 60 kilometres north of Christchurch, and Hanmer Springs is 76 kilometres (55 minutes drive) to the north-west. It is also situated on the Main North Line railway and the historic Weka Pass Railway.

Waipara lies at one of the points of the Alpine Pacific Triangle, which also includes the major tourist centres of Hanmer Springs and Kaikōura.

The Weka Pass Railway has its base in Waipara, and runs on 12 kilometres of track between there and Waikari over the former route of the Waiau Branch, a branch line railway that diverged from the Main North Line and ran to Waiau. The Glenmark station is based in Waipara.

The Glenmark church reopened in December 2023, having been damaged during the 2010 Christchurch earthquakes and then closed for repairs. The Waipara Hotel burnt down in 2014. It was not insured at the time and has not been replaced.

The Waipara region has a reputation as a premium area for the production of Pinot noir, Riesling and Chardonnay. Waipara is sheltered by the Teviot hills from the prevailing cool easterly winds and has the highest summer temperatures and the lowest rainfall of any of the New Zealand wine regions. Because of this, Waipara has over 26 wineries and 80 vineyards within the valley, which collectively produce around 100,000 cases of award-winning wine in an average year. Many of the vineyards offer tastings at their cellar doors and some also have restaurants attached.

There are a number of day walks close in Waipara including Tiromoana Bush Walkway and the Mt Cass Walkway which is closed during lambing season. Waipara would have been once been covered in tōtara, lacebark, kōwhai, lancewood and broadleaf forest. It is now predominantly vineyards. There have been a number of ongoing projects to increase the biodiversity of the area. Work is ongoing to plant native species in Waipara's shelter belts, stream boundaries, pond edges and vineyard borders. These have provided benefits in pollination, pest control and weed suppression. It has worked so well that the plantings have resulted in a drop in the use of pesticides in the vineyards. The Waipara Environmental Trapping Association (WETA) is aiming to trap rats and other introduced species with the aim of making Waipara a predator-free paradise for native birds.

In 2023, Australian-owned company Far North Solar Farm Ltd applied for consent to build a 180-hectare solar farm in Waipara on a site located between vineyards and the Alpine-Pacific Touring Route. The application attracted strong local opposition, including the establishment of a community group opposing the proposal. There are indications the application may be appealed to the Environment Court and higher courts in New Zealand.

== Fossils ==
Waipara is also known for some of the fossils discovered there including the Waipara penguin which is the second oldest penguin fossil to be found, a 62 million year old seabird Protodontopteryx ruthae and the Waipara turtle which is estimated to grow to 3 metres long and weigh around 600 kg, The first example of the extinct Haast's Eagle was found on Glenmark Station near Waipara in 1871.

== Demographics ==
Waipara is described by Stats NZ as a rural settlement and covers 0.59 km^{2} (0.23 sq mi). It had an estimated population of 340 as of June 2025, with a population density of 576 people per km^{2}. Waipara is part of the larger Omihi statistical area.

Historical population
Year	Pop.	±% p.a.
2006	258	—
2013	270	+0.65%
2018	315	+3.13%
2023	342	+1.66%

Waipara had a population of 342 in the 2023 New Zealand census, an increase of 27 people (8.6%) since the 2018 census, and an increase of 72 people (26.7%) since the 2013 census. There were 186 males and 159 females in 129 dwellings. 2.6% of people identified as LGBTIQ+. The median age was 44.1 years (compared with 38.1 years nationally). There were 69 people (20.2%) aged under 15 years, 42 (12.3%) aged 15 to 29, 156 (45.6%) aged 30 to 64, and 78 (22.8%) aged 65 or older.

People could identify as more than one ethnicity. The results were 91.2% European (Pākehā); 11.4% Māori; 1.8% Pasifika; 2.6% Asian; 1.8% Middle Eastern, Latin American and African New Zealanders (MELAA); and 7.0% other, which includes people giving their ethnicity as "New Zealander". English was spoken by 99.1%, Māori by 5.3%, and other languages by 4.4%. No language could be spoken by 0.9% (e.g. too young to talk). New Zealand Sign Language was known by 1.8%. The percentage of people born overseas was 18.4, compared with 28.8% nationally.

Religious affiliations were 23.7% Christian, 0.9% Māori religious beliefs, 0.9% New Age, 0.9% Jewish, and 0.9% other religions. People who answered that they had no religion were 65.8%, and 8.8% of people did not answer the census question.

Of those at least 15 years old, 30 (11.0%) people had a bachelor's or higher degree, 159 (58.2%) had a post-high school certificate or diploma, and 84 (30.8%) people exclusively held high school qualifications. The median income was $32,700, compared with $41,500 nationally. 15 people (5.5%) earned over $100,000 compared to 12.1% nationally. The employment status of those at least 15 was 126 (46.2%) full-time, 60 (22.0%) part-time, and 6 (2.2%) unemployed.

== Education ==
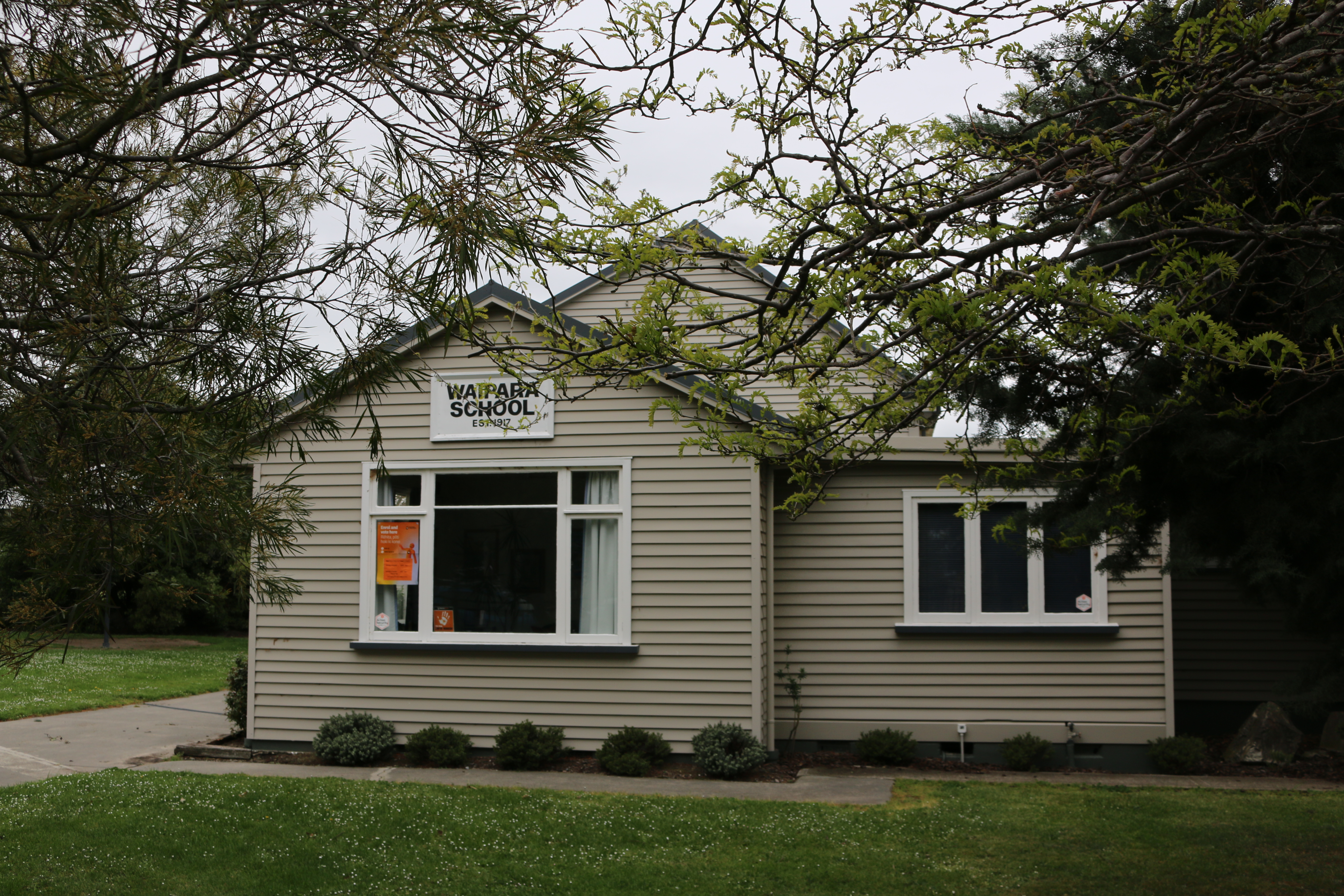
Waipara School, established 1917.

Waipara School is a co-educational state primary school for Year 1 to 8 students, with a roll of 32 as of July 2026. Waipara School was established in 1917.

== Sports ==
Waipara and Omihi are the catchment area to the Glenmark Rugby Club. The Glenmark rugby club rooms burnt down in 2015. There have been ten All Blacks who have played for Glenmark over the years including Todd Blackadder, Robbie Deans, Bruce Deans, Craig Green, and Andy Earl. Glenmark has had success in the North Canterbury Rugby Competition winning the title in 2016 by beating the Ashley Rugby Club.

The Waipara Classic cycle race starts and finishes in Waipara. It has varied in length between 61 km and 90 km over the years.

== Climate ==
Climate data for Waipara West, elevation 130 m (430 ft), (1991–2020 normals, extremes 1973–present)
Month	Jan	Feb	Mar	Apr	May	Jun	Jul	Aug	Sep	Oct	Nov	Dec	Year
Record high °C (°F)	37.4 (99.3)	38.0 (100.4)	34.4 (93.9)	29.6 (85.3)	27.6 (81.7)	23.1 (73.6)	22.0 (71.6)	24.3 (75.7)	28.8 (83.8)	29.8 (85.6)	32.1 (89.8)	33.8 (92.8)	38.0 (100.4)
Mean maximum °C (°F)	32.1 (89.8)	32.3 (90.1)	29.7 (85.5)	26.1 (79.0)	23.0 (73.4)	20.2 (68.4)	19.2 (66.6)	19.9 (67.8)	22.4 (72.3)	24.8 (76.6)	27.9 (82.2)	29.8 (85.6)	33.4 (92.1)
Mean daily maximum °C (°F)	23.2 (73.8)	23.0 (73.4)	21.2 (70.2)	18.1 (64.6)	15.6 (60.1)	12.5 (54.5)	12.1 (53.8)	13.3 (55.9)	15.4 (59.7)	17.3 (63.1)	19.3 (66.7)	21.5 (70.7)	17.7 (63.9)
Daily mean °C (°F)	17.4 (63.3)	17.1 (62.8)	15.5 (59.9)	12.7 (54.9)	10.5 (50.9)	7.8 (46.0)	7.3 (45.1)	8.4 (47.1)	10.3 (50.5)	11.9 (53.4)	13.8 (56.8)	15.9 (60.6)	12.4 (54.3)
Mean daily minimum °C (°F)	11.5 (52.7)	11.2 (52.2)	9.8 (49.6)	7.3 (45.1)	5.4 (41.7)	3.0 (37.4)	2.5 (36.5)	3.5 (38.3)	5.3 (41.5)	6.5 (43.7)	8.2 (46.8)	10.4 (50.7)	7.1 (44.7)
Mean minimum °C (°F)	5.6 (42.1)	5.9 (42.6)	4.2 (39.6)	2.1 (35.8)	0.2 (32.4)	−1.4 (29.5)	−1.9 (28.6)	−1.4 (29.5)	−0.7 (30.7)	0.7 (33.3)	2.2 (36.0)	4.7 (40.5)	−2.5 (27.5)
Record low °C (°F)	3.5 (38.3)	1.4 (34.5)	0.3 (32.5)	−1.9 (28.6)	−5.0 (23.0)	−7.0 (19.4)	−6.3 (20.7)	−5.2 (22.6)	−3.2 (26.2)	−2.3 (27.9)	−1.2 (29.8)	2 (36)	−7.0 (19.4)
Average rainfall mm (inches)	47.5 (1.87)	45.2 (1.78)	43.8 (1.72)	58.6 (2.31)	45.8 (1.80)	58.3 (2.30)	57.3 (2.26)	54.8 (2.16)	51.6 (2.03)	56.2 (2.21)	52.8 (2.08)	52.3 (2.06)	624.2 (24.58)
Mean monthly sunshine hours	247.0	231.9	216.7	187.5	165.7	130.8	140.5	172.3	199.6	243.1	246.4	243.1	2,424.6
Source: NIWA

== Notable residents ==
George Henry Moore was the owner of Glenmark Station just to the north of Waipara. At one stage there were 90,000 sheep and it was the most valuable farm in New Zealand.
