= Biodiversity of the Kaikōura region =

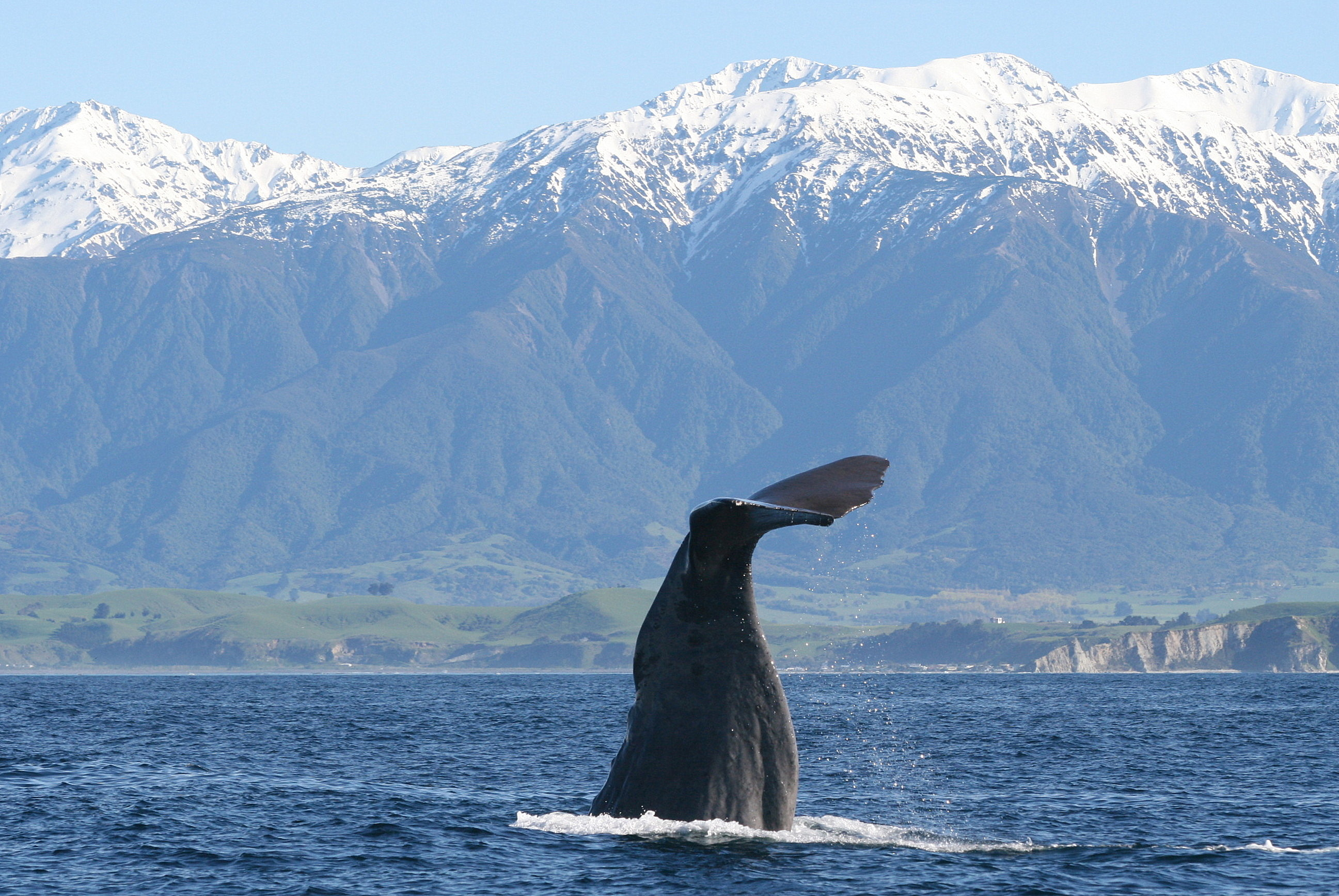
Diving sperm whale near the coast of Kaikōura

The biodiversity of the Kaikōura region is the variety and variability of life within the land area of the Kaikōura District in New Zealand, and the ocean out to the territorial limit. The region has a diverse landscape ranging from a rugged sea coastline to high mountains. These landforms are shaped by ongoing tectonic movement and seismic activity. The waters offshore are particularly rich in marine life as a result of the convergence of two ocean currents, and the ocean canyon that creates deep water close inshore. The ocean environment offshore from Kaikōura is fundamental to much of the biodiversity in the region.

The economy of the Kaikōura District and township relies to a significant extent on the visitors who come to experience the biodiversity of the local region. Tourism represents around 25% of the GDP of the Kaikōura District.

== Geography ==
=== Land environment ===
The geography of the Kaikōura region is characterized by a diverse landscape ranging from a rugged sea coastline to high mountains rising to 2,886 m (9,469 ft). These landforms have been shaped by ongoing fault activity, creating diverse landscapes like alpine ranges, limestone hills, floodplains, and rocky cliffs. The stretch of coastline stretching roughly between the mouths of the Conway and Waiau Toa / Clarence Rivers is generally known as the Kaikōura coast. This coast is unusual for the east of the South Island, as there is very little coastal plain, with the Seaward Kaikōura Range, a branch of the Southern Alps, rising straight from the ocean in places.

The climate of this zone is strongly influenced by the Kaikōura Ranges and Southern Alps to the west. Summer temperatures can be warm, particularly when hot dry northwesterly winds blow over the Alps, although summer temperatures are often reduced by a cool sea breeze from the northeast. Long dry spells can occur, and mean annual rainfall is low. Cold southwesterly winds are more frequent during winter. Winters are cold and frosts can occur.

=== Ocean environment ===
The ocean environment offshore from Kaikōura is fundamental to much of the biodiversity in the region. The Kaikōura Canyon is a submarine canyon located southwest of the Kaikōura Peninsula. It is a southern branch of the Hikurangi Trough that extends northwards up New Zealand's eastern coast. The canyon descends into deep water and merges into an ocean channel system that can be traced for hundreds of kilometres across the deep ocean floor. At the head of the canyon, the depth of water is around 30 metres (98 ft), but it drops rapidly to 600 metres (2,000 ft) and continues down to around 2,000 metres (6,600 ft) deep where it meets the Hikurangi Channel. The canyon has been described as a "biodiversity hotspot", where upwelling of currents from the deep ocean provide feeding grounds along the Kaikōura coast and in offshore waters for a diverse range of seabirds and marine mammals. Studies of the Kaikōura Canyon have found that it is a highly productive ecosystem with 10 to 100 times the density of marine life found in other deep sea habitats. Sperm whales can be seen close to the coast south of the Kaikōura Peninsula, because the deep water of the Kaikōura Canyon is only one kilometre (0.62 mi) off the shoreline at Goose Bay. A major Subantarctic Surface Water (SAW) current moves north up the coast of the South Island, coming inshore near Kaikōura during summer but being deflected by a northerly subtropical current during winter and early spring; this flow reversal is correlated with changes in the diving and feeding behaviour of sperm whales.

The town owes its origin to richness of marine life in the ocean, since it developed as a centre for the whaling industry. The name Kaikōura means 'meal of crayfish' (kai – food/meal, kōura – crayfish) and the crayfish industry still plays a role in the economy of the region. However, Kaikōura has now become a popular tourist destination, mainly for whale watching and swimming with or near dolphins.

=== Human impact ===
Archaeological investigations of the Wairau Bar on the coast approximately 100 km (62 mi) north of Kaikōura suggest that this site was part of the first era of colonisation of New Zealand, around 1288–1300 CE. Wairau Bar is a rare example in New Zealand of an early East Polynesian settlement clustered around a central point, and is described as "the type-site of the earliest phase of New Zealand’s prehistory". The Kaikōura coastline was probably visited or occupied around that time. Fire has been a major factor in changing the environment of the Kaikōura region since the time of occupation. In particular, from around the 1860s clearance of land by European settlers has involved repeated burning of high country to enable grazing of sheep.

== Protected areas ==
=== Protected areas on land ===
The Ka Whata Tu O Rakihouia Conservation Park covers part of the Seaward Kaikōura Range between Kaikōura and Clarence. The area of the park is 88,065 ha (217,610 acres), representing 43% of the total land area of the Kaikōura District (2,048 km^{2} (791 sq mi). The main breeding colony of the endangered Hutton's shearwater is located in the headwaters of the Kowhai River. The area of the colony is protected as the Mount Uwerau Nature Reserve. This is a strict nature reserve of 1,102 ha (2,720 acres) within the Ka Whata Tu o Rakihouia Conservation Park where no public access is permitted.

Kowhai Bush, a 240 ha (590 acres) reserve on the banks of the Kowhai River and about 7 km (4.3 mi) inland from the Kaikōura Peninsula, has been an important locality for studies of native forest birds. The bush is flat, with a uniform canopy-height. It attracted attention from the New Zealand Wildlife Service in the 1970s, because the bush had an accessible population of South Island robins. These were studied to obtain information that could help with conservation of the endangered Chatham Island black robin. Then, in years and decades following, various post-graduate students from Canterbury University conducted field-work for their post-graduate theses at Kowhai Bush, with the nearby university field station (Edward Percival Marine Laboratory) providing logistical support. The species studied have included riflemen, pīpipi, New Zealand fantails, South Island robins, grey warblers and shining cuckoos.

Blue Duck Scientific Reserve is a 153 ha (380 acres) scientific reserve, located around 20 km (12 mi) north of Kaikōura. It is one of the largest mixed podocarp forests that remain along the entire east coast of the South Island. The importance of the forest was formally recognised in 1903, when 85 ha (210 acres) was gazetted as a reserve.

The Ō Tamakura Historic Reserve, formerly known as the Goose Bay-Omihi Scenic Reserve, lies to the south of Goose Bay. It contains a coastal forest of beech and podocarps, and adjoins the Ote Makura Scenic Reserve.

=== Marine protected areas ===
An incorporated society, Te Korowai o Te Tai o Marokura, Kaikōura Coastal Marine Guardians (Te Korowai) was formed in 2005 to develop use and protection strategies and actions for the Kaikōura coast. The work of the society led to the passing of the Kaikōura (Te Tai o Marokura) Marine Management Act in August 2014. This Act established the Kaikōura marine management area, including a new marine reserve, sanctuaries and protections for whales and fur seals, and established new fishing regulations. It also recognised taiapure (traditional Māori fishing grounds which include areas of special cultural or spiritual significance).

The Hikurangi Marine Reserve is a marine reserve off the Kaikōura coast, covering an area of 10,416 ha (25,740 acres) south of the township, and including part of the Kaikōura canyon. The reserve was established in 2014, and is the largest and deepest marine reserve adjacent to any of New Zealand's three main islands. No fishing, harvesting or mining is allowed in the reserve.

The Kaikōura (Te Tai o Marokura) Marine Management Act 2014 established the Te Rohe o Te Whānau Puha Whale Sanctuary covering 4,686 km^{2} (1,809 sq mi), and extending 45 km (28 mi) north and south of the Kaikōura Peninsula and 56 km (35 mi) out to sea, to provide additional protection for marine mammals in this area.

== Faunal diversity ==
=== Marine mammals ===
A wide variety of marine mammals can be seen in the Kaikōura region, including whales, dolphins, and New Zealand fur seals. The Marine Mammals Protection Act 1978 provides legal protection for these animals, and regulations set conditions that govern human behaviour in the vicinity of marine mammals. Permits are required for commercial tourist operations associated with marine mammals.

==== New Zealand fur seals ====
The New Zealand fur seal (Arctocephalus forsteri) is found in temperate latitudes around New Zealand and Australia. From the time of arrival of Māori, fur seals were hunted for food. By the time of arrival of Europeans, the breeding range of fur seals was limited to southern parts of the South Island. Large scale commercial harvesting of seals for their skins led to the collapse of the population around the southern parts of New Zealand and outlying islands. The sealing industry closed in 1894.

By the 1950s, fur seals were reported in surveys of the Kaikōura coast, but there was no breeding observed. Fur seals eventually received full legal protection in 1978 with the passing of the Marine Mammals Protection Act. Populations increased significantly, and breeding was reported in the Kaikōura region from around 1990. One of the main breeding areas in the Kaikōura District is 26 km (16 mi) north of Kaikōura town at Ōhau Point, where exponential growth of 32% per annum was recorded between 2002 and 2005, and 25% per annum between 2006 and 2009. Fur seals also breed around the Kaikōura Peninsula, and 10 km (6.2 mi) south of the peninsula at Riley’s Lookout / Panau Island. Although accused of impacting commercial fisheries, a 30-year study of the Kaikōura fur seals showed they mostly ate octopus, arrow squid, lanternfish, barracouta, hoki, and āhuru, most of which are not commercial species.

Prior to the 2016 Kaikōura earthquake, a waterfall pool in Ōhau Stream, close to Ōhau Point, was a popular visitor attraction where baby fur seals could be observed in the pool and stream. The section of State Highway 1 at Ōhau Point was badly damaged in the earthquake, and the track to the waterfall pool was closed because of rock falls. In the rebuild of the highway following the earthquake, a car park and lookout was constructed at Ōhau Point where travellers can observe fur seals on the seaward side of the road.

==== Whales ====
Sperm whales (Physetar macrocephalus) can be observed all year round, most days coming within 10 km of Kaikōura. Sperm whales are deep-water feeders, usually at depths of 1,000 m and up to 3,200 m. The productive cold water upwelling along the Hikurangi Trench is pushed to the surface just off Riley's Rock, a landmark named after Barney Riley, who was a spotter in the early Kaikōura whaling industry and knew this feature marked a whale feeding area.

Stomach contents of over 150 whales caught in the 1960s revealed most of their diet was medium-sized squid, and the rest fish—only one beak from a giant squid was recovered.

A sperm whale's feeding routine consists of 40-minute dives with ten-minute rests in between, during which they are easily observed from boats. Whale watching is a popular tourist attraction for Kaikōura, and an important contributor to the local economy; the town owes its economic resurgence to the presence of sperm whales close to shore.

Adult sperm whales are segregated by sex: nursery groups of females and calves are not found as far south as Kaikōura, so all the sperm whales seen at Kaikōura are males. A survey in 1995 determined two thirds of them were adolescents (aged 10–20), and the rest 25 years or older. Over two hundred individuals have been identified from patterns of nicks and marks on their tail flukes. By 2002, around 80 sperm wales were present in any one summer or winter, some returning repeatedly for years; one first recorded in 1992 was still visiting in July 2006.

Humpback whales are often seen inshore near Kaikōura in June and July during their winter migration. Southern right whales and blue whales are seen several times a year inshore, and long-finned pilot whales offshore. There have been rare sightings of minke whales, fin whales, pygmy right whales, and beaked whales.

==== Dolphins ====
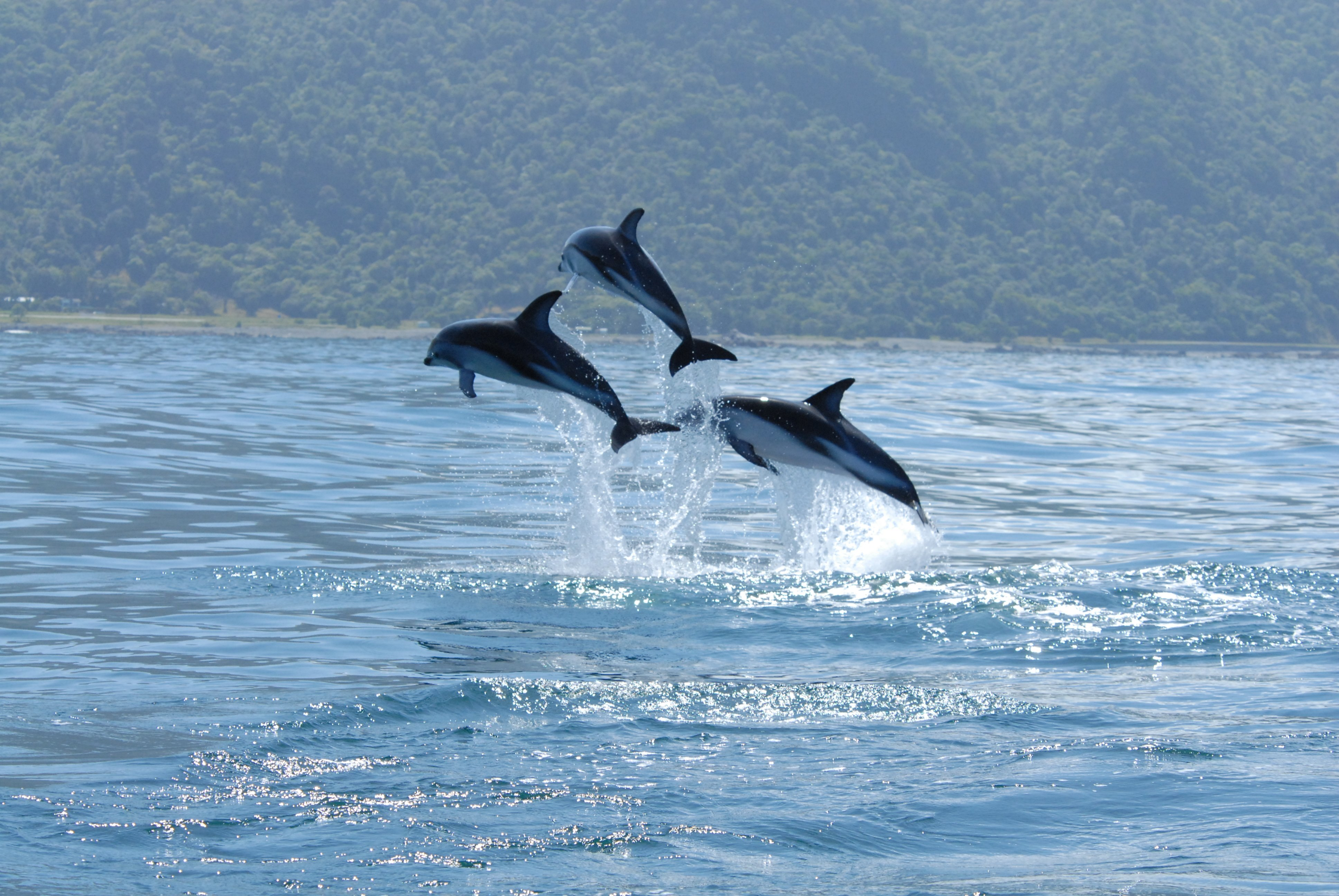
Dusky dolphins

The most commons dolphin species near Kaikōura is the dusky dolphin, which like the sperm whale relies on the nearby continental shelf for feeding. At the Kaikōura coast dolphins obey a routine of feeding along the coastline close inshore during the day, and at night travelling offshore to the edge of the shelf. There they feed on a dense assemblage of crustaceans, salps, jellyfish, and small fish, especially myctophid lanternfish, that ascend to close to the sea surface at night.

Dusky dolphins are extremely gregarious, forming groups of typically 150–300, or up to 1000 in winter, in which individual dolphins undertake spectacular jumps and somersaults. A mark-recapture study in 2004 estimated that at any one time 2000 dusky dolphins were present in Kaikōura, out of a national population of 12,000. They are highly mobile, with some tagged dolphins moving from Kaikōura to Admiralty Bay, near D'Urville Island, in the winter.

Other species of dolphin can be seen in the waters off Kaikōura: bottlenose dolphins, common dolphins, and the endangered Hector's dolphin. Orca can be seen from December to March.

=== Birds ===
About thirty indigenous bird species are resident breeders in the Kaikōura District. Another fifty species have been recorded as occasional visitors. Because of the virtual absence of shallow lakes and swampy wetlands, waterfowl species are poorly represented. Three small lakes near Kaikōura (Rotoroa, Rotoiti, and Leg of Mutton) do have a high diversity of birds, 47 species being recorded in the 1960s including three nesting species of Phalacrocorax shags.

==== Seabirds ====
New Zealand has an unusually high diversity of shags, penguins, petrels and albatross species, leading to claims that the country is the "seabird capital of the world". Some of these seabird species are in significant decline, and many are critically endangered. Kaikōura has been described as "one of the best places in the world to see seabirds", with exceptional diversity of albatross species. Seabird species that can be seen in the Kaikōura region include:

- fourteen species of albatross: wandering, Antipodean, northern royal, southern royal, black-browed, Campbell, white-capped, Salvin's, Chatham, Buller's, Atlantic yellow-nosed, Indian yellow-nosed, light-mantled, sooty
- ten species of petrel: Cook's, grey-faced, Cape, black, white-chinned, Westland, grey, white-headed, mottled, soft-plumaged
- seven species of shearwater: Buller's, sooty, Hutton's, fluttering, short-tailed, flesh-footed, pink-footed
- four species of skua: Arctic, pomarine, long-tailed, brown
- four species of storm petrel: white-faced, Wilson's, grey-backed, black-bellied
- four species of penguin: little, yellow-eyed, erect-crested, chinstrap
- two species of giant petrel: southern giant petrel, northern giant petrel

Other notable seabirds observed off Kaikōura include: Antarctic fulmar, fairy prion, grey phalarope, black-billed gull, Arctic tern, black-fronted tern and common diving petrel. Also regularly seen are the pied shag, little shag, spotted shag, Australasian gannet, southern black-backed gull, red-billed gull, and white-fronted tern.

From a local conservation perspective, particularly notable seabirds in the Kaikōura region include the Hutton's shearwater, the red-billed gull, and the little penguin.

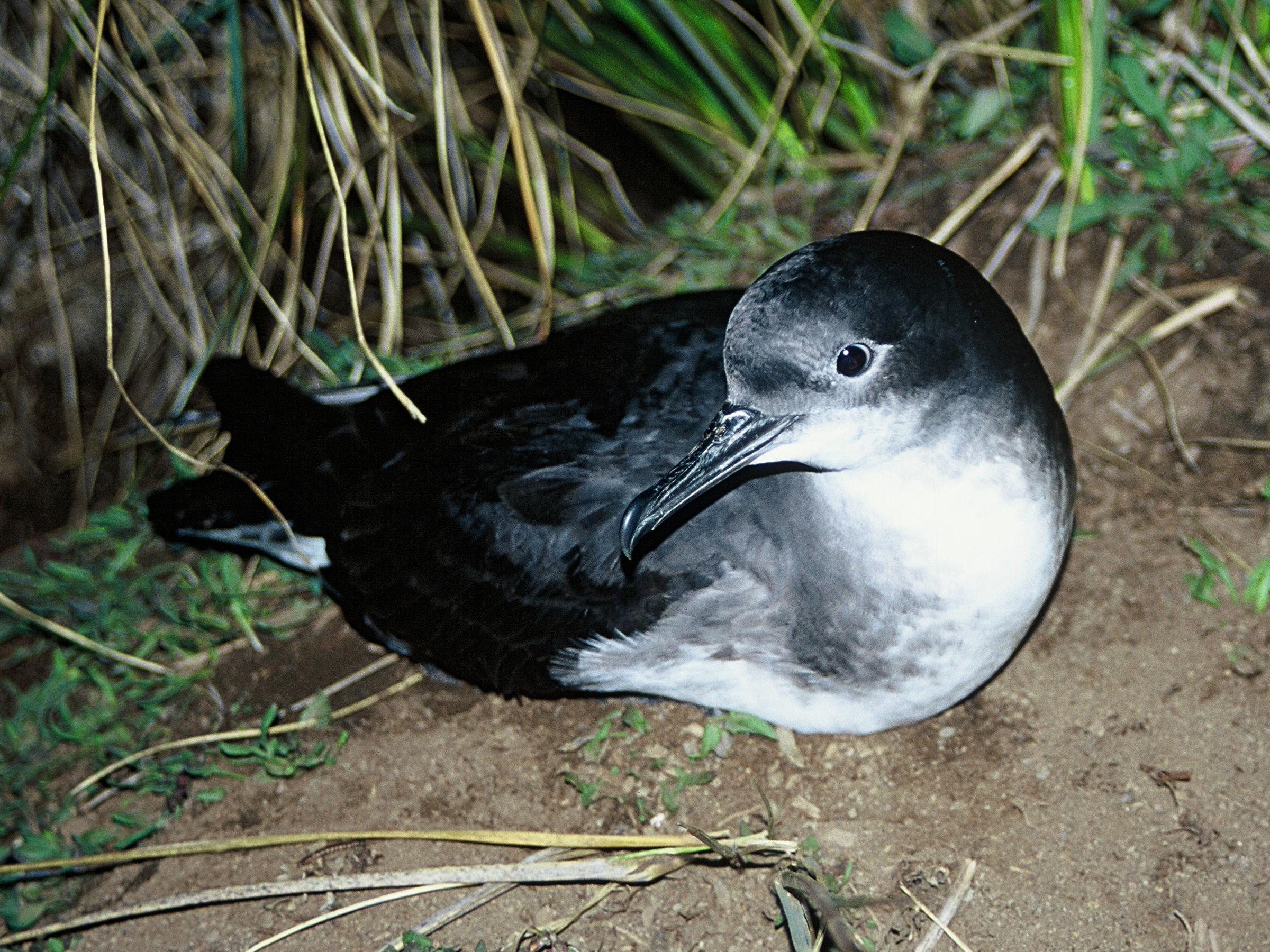
Hutton's shearwater

===== Hutton's shearwater =====
The Hutton's shearwater (Puffinus huttoni) or Kaikōura tītī is an endangered seabird in the family Procellariidae. It is found in waters around Australia and New Zealand but it only breeds in the Seaward Kaikōura Range in New Zealand. It is the only seabird in the world that breeds in an alpine environment. Nests have been found at elevations from 1200 to 1800 metres. The Kowhai Valley and Shearwater Stream now contain the only two remaining alpine breeding colonies. Six other colonies that were observed by Geoff Harrow in the 1960s have been wiped out by feral pigs. In 2005, an artificial breeding colony for Hutton's shearwaters was established in a protected area on the Kaikōura Peninsula, as a conservation measure.

Hutton's shearwaters fly to and from their breeding colonies at night, but can become disoriented by bright lights. Fledglings are particularly vulnerable when they leave the breeding colony, and can crash-land on roads in the town. They are usually unable to take off again, making them vulnerable to being run over by vehicles or succumbing to predation by dogs or cats. Conservation organisations in Kaikōura rescue stranded birds for later release, and advocate for reduced lighting. Work on improving protection for the Hutton's shearwater from the effects of artificial light in the town began in 2020. The Kaikōura Dark Sky Sanctuary was accredited by DarkSky International in September 2024. One of the main drivers for establishing the dark sky sanctuary was to protect the Hutton's shearwater.

===== Red-billed gull =====
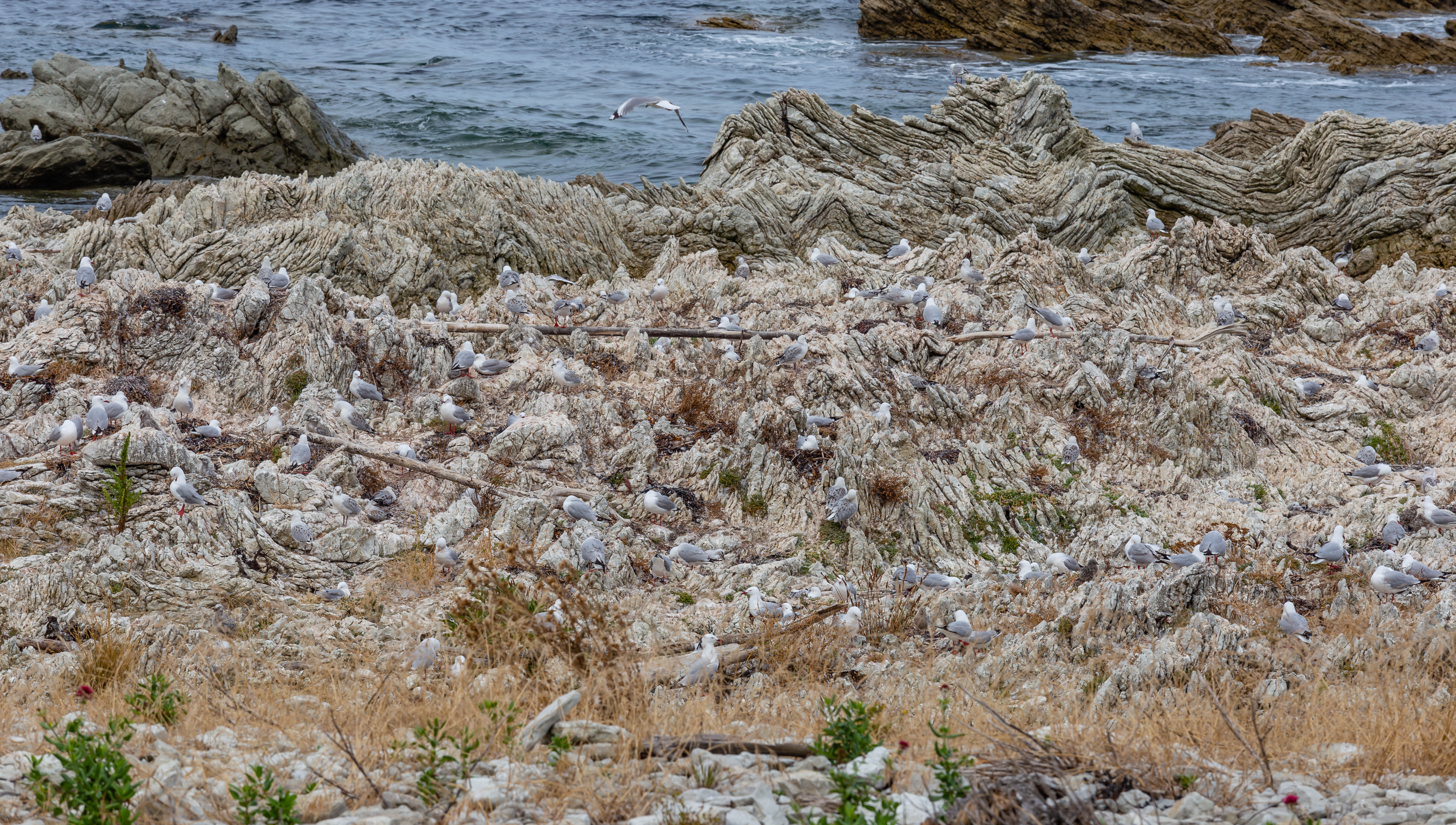
Red-billed gull colony, Kaikōura

The red-billed gull also known as tarāpunga is native to New Zealand. The Kaikōura Peninsula has one of the three largest breeding colonies of these gulls, but the local population is in significant decline. In contrast, there has been an increase in the population of red-billed gulls at the breeding colony at Otago Peninsula, where there is control of mammalian predators.

===== Little penguin =====
The little penguin or kororā is found along the Kaikōura coastline. These birds are vulnerable to becoming entangled in fishing nets, and while on land are vulnerable to vehicle impact and predation by rats and domestic dogs. In a 2020 survey of 75 km (47 mi) of Kaikōura coastline, the only breeding colony located was in fragmented areas around the southern part of the Kaikōura Peninsula. In September 2026, Sabrina Luecht, a conservation advocate at Kaikōura and founder of Kaikōura Wildlife Rescue reported that the local kororā population was down to less than 50 birds, and was facing seasonal starvation as a result of depleted fish stocks and climate change. Luecht urged that the local colony of kororā should be vaccinated against the H5N1 virus that was expected to arrive in the region imminently, in a similar approach to that taken in Australia for 6,000 little penguins at St Kilda and Phillip Island. The proposal was rejected by the Department of Conservation and the Minister of Conservation, Tama Potaka. Luecht warned that mass mortality of the local penguin population was likely without vaccination.

==== Shorebirds ====
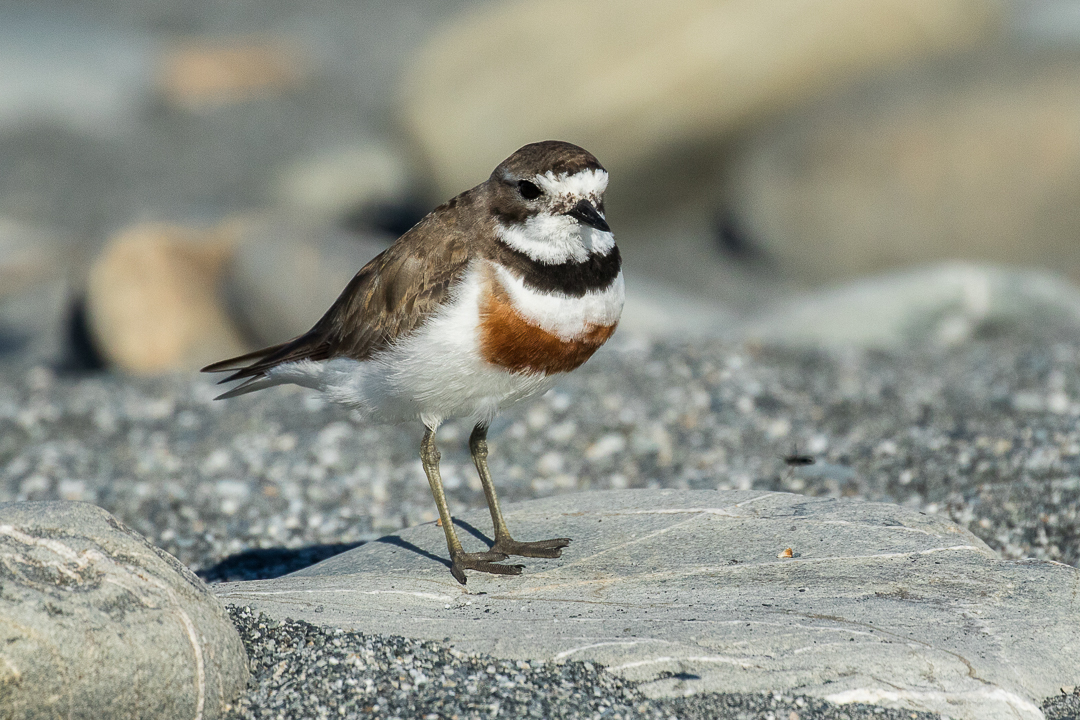
Banded dotterel

===== Banded dotterel =====
The double-banded plover, known in New Zealand as the banded dotterel or pohowera, is a species of bird in the plover family that nests on stony beaches around the Kaikōura Peninsula and South Bay. The species is listed as Nationally Vulnerable.

Breeding success of banded dotterels at Kaikōura has been severely affected by predation from cats. A community-driven action plan is being developed to protect the habitat of nesting shorebirds at South Bay, with support from Environment Canterbury, Kaikōura District Council, University of Canterbury and Te Rūnanga o Kaikōura.

==== Conservation initiatives ====
===== Important Bird Area =====
The Ka Whata Tu O Rakihouia / Kaikōura Important Bird Area is an area designated by BirdLife International that covers 308 km^{2} (119 sq mi) and includes the Kaikōura coastline and all of the Kaikōura Peninsula. The altitude range is from sea level to 2,596 m (8,517 ft). Two key sites of the IBA within the Seaward Kaikōura Range contain the entire breeding population of Hutton's shearwaters; about 100,000 pairs in two colonies, some 15 km (9.3 mi) inland from the coastal town of Kaikōura, at an altitude of 1,200–1,800 m (3,900–5,900 ft) above sea level.

===== Wildlife rehabilitation =====
Sabrina Luecht established Kaikōura Wildlife Rescue in September 2017. The first animal Luecht treated in Kaikōura was a little penguin (kororā), dropped off two weeks before the new rescue centre was opened. At that point, the project was entirely self-funded. In 2021, Luecht and her supporters established the Kaikōura Wildlife Centre Trust with the aim of creating a wildlife hospital and centre for conservation in the town. A brand, Project Wellbird, has been created as part of the initiative.

=== Insects ===
The Kaikōura giant wētā (Deinacrida parva) is found between 150 and 1500m above sea level from South Marlborough to Hanmer Springs. These weta are considered subalpine specialists. They are most common surrounding Hapuku and Kowhai rivers close to Kaikōura (hence the name of these wētā). It is suspected they now occupy less than 10% of their former range.

== Diversity of ecological zones on land ==
Despite the impacts of fire on most of the original vegetation of the region, small remnants of original forest types can still be found.

=== Coastal scrub-hardwood forest ===
There are examples of coastal scrub-hardwood forest in the Seaward Kaikōura Range. This forest is a tītoki-ngaio warm temperate forest type. The trees in this forest type are dominated by mahoe (Melicytus ramiflorus), tītoki (Alectryon excelsus) and ngaio (Myoporum laetum). The main species in the shrub layer in the forest is kawakawa (Piper excelsum), but pigeonwood (Hedycarya arborea) and Coprosma crassifolia are also present.

=== Black beech forest ===
Black beech (Nothofagus solandri) forest is found in small areas totalling around 400 ha (990 acres) on the eastern side of the Inland Kaikōura Range, at elevations from 600 to 1,400 m (2,000 to 4,600 ft). This is a mild temperature forest type, with a sub-canopy layer including kapuka (Griselinia littoralis), Hall's tōtara (Podocarpus laetus), lancewood (Pseudopanax crassifolius), putaputāwētā (Carpodetus serratus), and mountain fivefinger (Pseudopanax colensoi).

=== Scrub and shrubland ===
Matagouri (Discaria toumatou) and Coprosma propinqua are common in scrub and shrubland of the Inland Kaikōura Range at elevations from 480 to 1,000 m (1,570 to 3,280 ft), particularly on sites that have had large scale disturbance from fire. This type of plant community is colloquially referred to as "grey scrub", and can be associated with other common divaricating or small-leaved shrub species.

=== Threatened species ===
The higher elevation areas of the Kaikōura region have populations of threatened plant species like weeping broom (Carmichaelia stevensonii), climbing broom (Carmichaelia kirkii), and the largest known population of Hector’s tree daisy (Olearia hectorii) in New Zealand, located in the catchment of the Clarence River.

== See also ==
- Biodiversity of New Zealand

== Citations ==
=== Sources cited ===
- Baird, S.J. (2011). "New Zealand fur seals — summary of current knowledge" (PDF). New Zealand aquatic environment and biodiversity report. 72. Wellington. ISSN 1179-6480. Wikidata Q137101549.
- Boren, Laura (2005). New Zealand fur seals in the Kaikoura region: colony dynamics, maternal investment and health (Doctor of Philosophy thesis). University of Canterbury. doi:10.26021/9275. hdl:10092/1270. Wikidata Q112866655.
- Breese, E.D.; Timmins, S.M.; Garrick, A.G.; Owen, J.M.; Jane, G.T. (1986). "Kaikoura ecological region: Survey report for the Protected Natural Areas Programme" (PDF). New Zealand Protected Natural Areas Programme. 5. Wellington. ISSN 0112-9252. Wikidata Q137352252.
- McGlone, M.; Brasher, L. (1995). "The Deforestation of the Upper Awatere Catchment, Inland Kaikoura Range, Marlborough, South-Island, New Zealand" (PDF). New Zealand Journal of Ecology. 19 (1): 53–66. ISSN 0110-6465. Wikidata Q134584001.
- Singers, N.J.D; Rogers, G.M. (2014). "A classification of New Zealand's terrestrial ecosystems" (PDF). Science for Conservation. 325. ISSN 1173-2946. Wikidata Q137345932.
- Wardle, J. (1971). "The forests and shrublands of the Seaward Kaikoura Range". New Zealand Journal of Botany. 9 (2): 269–292. doi:10.1080/0028825x.1971.10429140. Wikidata Q114101368.
- Williams, P.A. (1989). "Vegetation of the Inland Kaikoura Range Marlborough". New Zealand Journal of Botany. 27 (2): 201–220. doi:10.1080/0028825x.1989.10410375. Wikidata Q134584094.
