= Hundalee Fault =

Active fault in New Zealand

- Map of Hundalee Fault surface active fault (red) and inferred active fault (red shading).
- Etymology: Hundalee
- Country: New Zealand
- Region: Canterbury

Characteristics
- Dip: 50°
- Displacement: In 2016 Kaikōura earthquake Maximum vertical offset 2.5m, maximum horizontal offset 3.7m Long term vertical slip rate = 0.3 mm (0.012 in)/year

Tectonics
- Plate: Indo-Australian, Pacific
- Status: Active
- Earthquakes: 7.8 M_{w} 2016 Kaikōura earthquake
- Type: Strike-slip faults
- Movement: Oblique dextral-reverse slip along northeast-trending sections and reverse-sinistral slip along north to north-northeast-trending sections
- Age: Meghalayan
- Orogeny: Kaikoura
- New Zealand geology database (includes faults)

The Hundalee Fault in northern coastal Canterbury, New Zealand had a significant rupture in the 7.8 M_{w} 2016 Kaikōura earthquake for a minimal length of 23 km (14 mi) and as such was a key linkage fault in this complex earthquake. It is located between Parnassus in the Hurunui District and runs off shore from near Oaro.

== Geology ==
The Hundalee Fault is SW-NE-trending and within the linked area of faulting called the Northern Canterbury domain to the south of the main active faults of the Marlborough Fault System. The fault has probably had three surface ruptures in the last 3500 years.

Some early work on the 2016 Kaikōura earthquake had included the Whites Fault (Whites Linement) to the Hundalee's Fault north as part of the Hundalee Fault but the strikes are quite different. To the fault's south is the Leamington Fault and intersecting it at the Okarahia Stream from the north west is the Stone Jug Fault.

There is regional shortening due to the convergence of the Pacific Plate that contains Canterbury with the Australian Plate on the western side of the Southern Alps raised by the Alpine Fault. The fault is known to have greater than 1 km (0.62 mi) late Cenozoic throw and is regarded as a mature fault with slip has localized into less than 10 cm (3.9 in) thick gouge zones. On its northside over the Oaro River valley are the uplifted relatively low Hundalee Hills. During the last 30,000 years the vertical slip rate has been estimated to be between 0.2 mm and 0.4 mm/year.

=== 2016 Kaikōura earthquake ===
In terms of the rupture sequence, the earthquake initiated on the Humps Fault, about 10 km (6.2 mi) northwest of the Hundalee Fault. The rupture progressed through the Leader fault towards a section of the Hope Fault but was linked by the Conway-Charwell faults to return towards the east coast down the Stone Jug Fault so causing partial rupture of the Hundalee Fault. The Hundalee rupture facilitated northside uplift of the Hundalee Hills consistent with previous kinematics of the Hundalee Fault. The rupture then transferred from the Hundaless Fault to the Whites Fault north of Oaro where the reverse-sinistral Whites fault rupture generated westside up movement and further uplift of the highest summits of the Hundalee Hills. The earthquake went on to progressively rupture faults such as the Jordan Thrust and then the Kekerengu Fault to the northeast of the eastern part of the Marlborough Fault System.

It is speculated that the 2016 rupture was imposed on the Hundalee fault by movement across an inefficient multifault network rather than independent rupture of the Hundalee fault itself. This is because of the discontinuities in the surface rupture which was up to 2.5 m (8 ft 2 in) ± 0.5 m (1 ft 8 in) vertically and 3.7 m (12 ft) ± 0.5 m (1 ft 8 in) horizontally, but this large amount of rupture was confined to only half of its northeastern fault-length. The vertical surface rupture to the south part of the fault was more like 0.5 m (1 ft 8 in) petering out so for 9 km (5.6 mi) it is just subsurface uplift inferred from optical imaging studies.

== See also ==
- 2016 Kaikōura earthquake
- List of earthquakes in New Zealand
