= Goose Bay =

Goose Bay may refer to:

- Happy Valley-Goose Bay, a town in Newfoundland and Labrador, Canada
  - CFB Goose Bay, a Canadian Forces Base located in Happy Valley-Goose Bay
- Goose Bay, a hamlet on the namesake bay in Alexandria, New York, United States
- Goose Bay (Newfoundland and Labrador), a natural bay off the island of Newfoundland in Newfoundland and Labrador, Canada
- Goose Bay, New Zealand, a coastal settlement south of Kaikōura, New Zealand
- HMCS Goose Bay, ship
- Goose Bay Airport (Alaska), an airport near Anchorage, Alaska
