= Queensgate Shopping Centre, New Zealand =

Shopping mall in Lower Hutt, New Zealand

Queensgate Shopping Centre
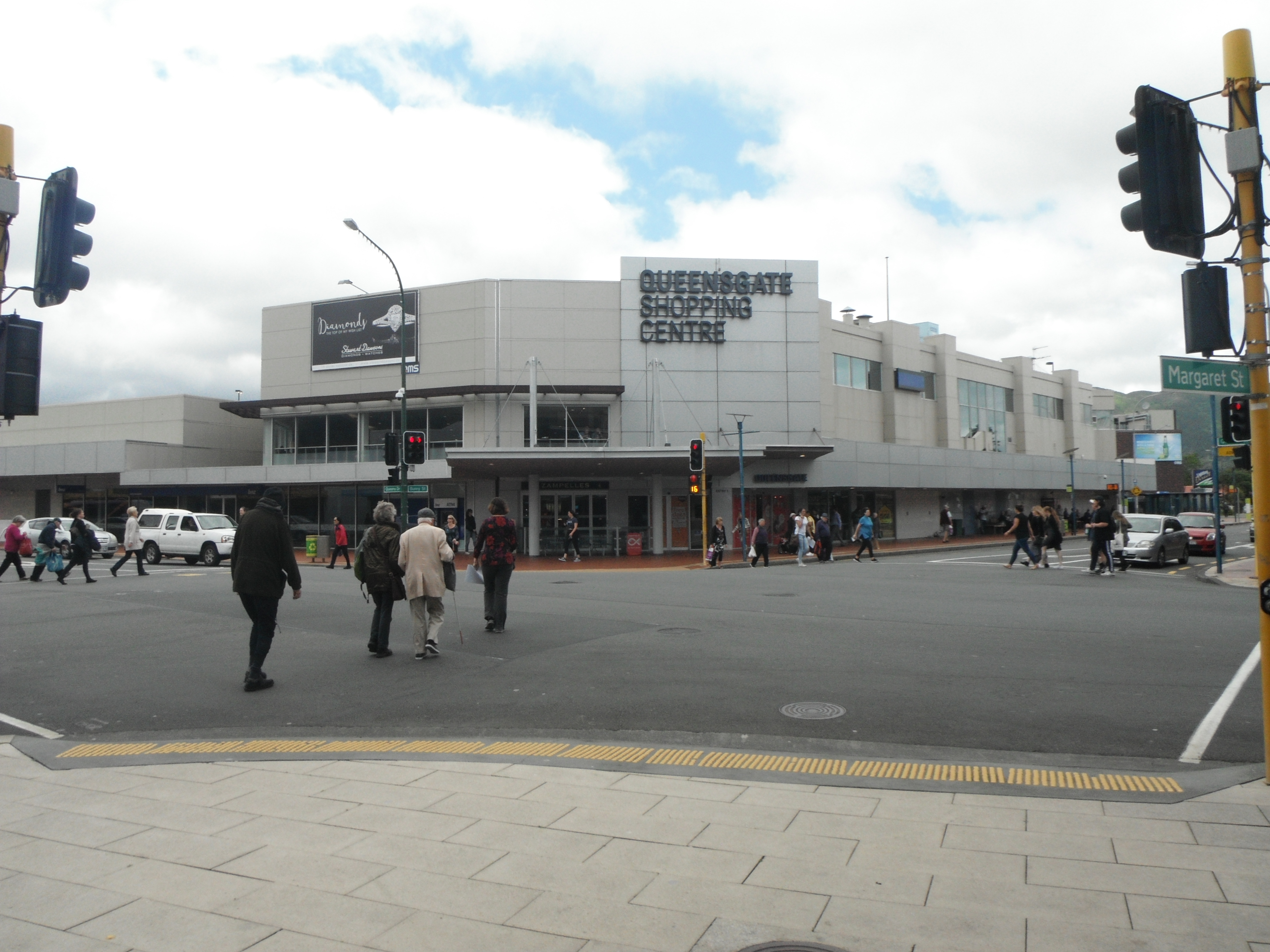
- The centre from the Queens Drive/Bunny Street intersection, December 2016
- Location: Lower Hutt, Wellington, New Zealand
- Coordinates: 41.210228°S 174.906775°E
- Opened: October 1986; 40 years ago
- Owner: Stride Property (current)
- Num. of stores: 134
- Num. of anchor tenants: 7
- Floor area: 45,467 m^{2} (489,400 sq ft)
- Floors: 3
- Website: queensgateshopping.co.nz

Queensgate Shopping Centre (formerly Westfield Queensgate) is a medium-sized shopping centre in central Lower Hutt, Wellington, New Zealand. The centre first opened in October 1986, and underwent a large scale redevelopment that was completed in August 2006. The centre features over 130 speciality stores. The centre is anchored by Farmers, JB Hi-Fi, H&M, Bed Bath & Beyond, The Warehouse, Woolworths and Event Cinemas.

== History and development ==
The area was formerly a residential area. The houses were demolished in the mid-60s to mid-70s to make way for a transport centre. The centre opened in 1986. The centre refurbished in 1991 and was expanded. It was purchased by Westfield in 1999. Between 2004 and 2006 the mall had a big expansion doubling the size of the centre with a bigger carpark, more shops and a new Event Cinemas multiplex. The Woolworths supermarket that is overtaken by the carpark now has now moved south-east of the mall under The Warehouse. The centre has a catchment area of 375,030+ people. The centre has a footfall of over 8 million people per annum. The centre's floor space is 45,467 m^{2} (489,400 sq ft) and the centre has an annual turnover of NZ$202.5 million.

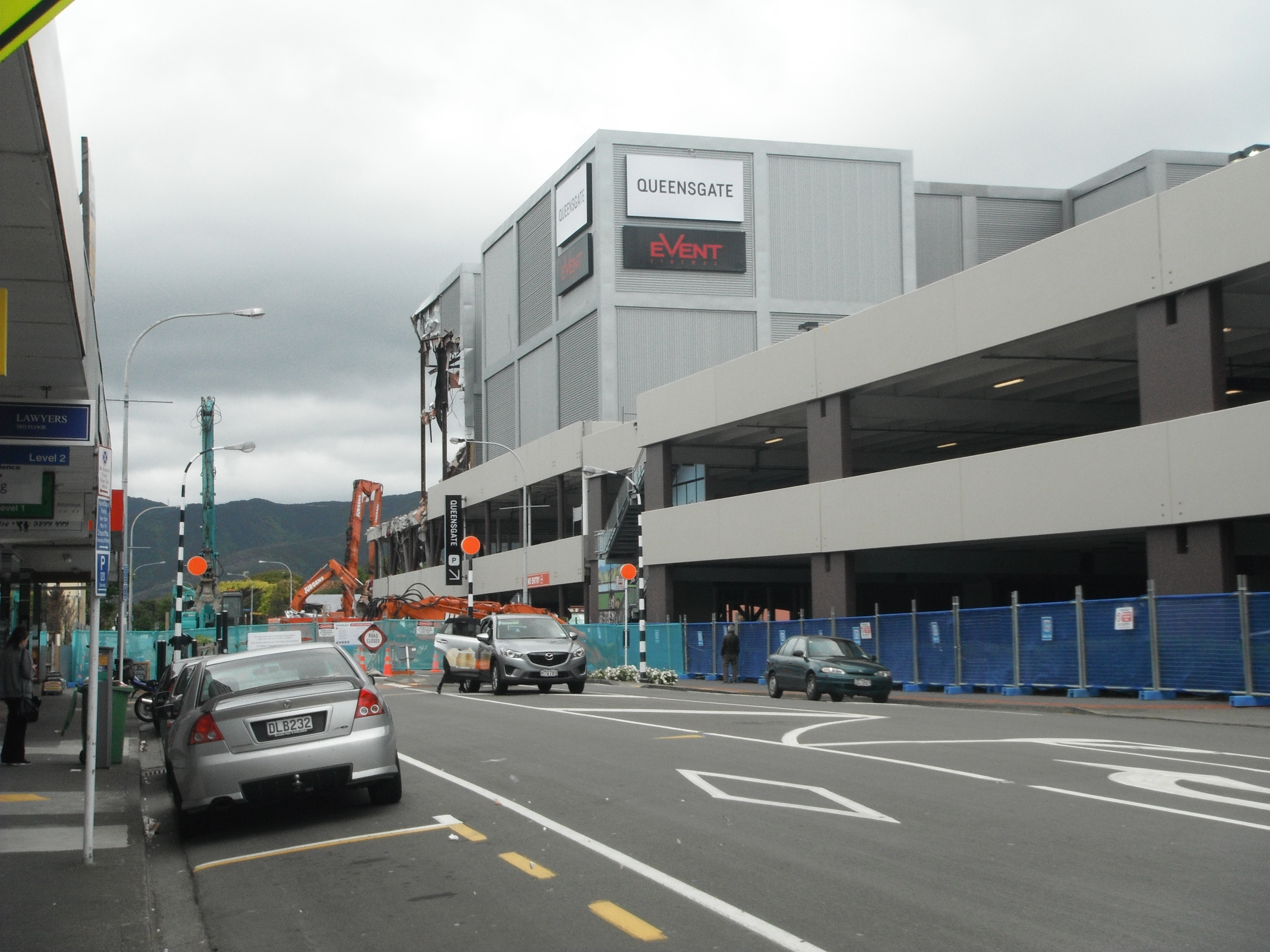
The Event Cinemas and part of the parking building at the northeast corner of the centre being demolished, 6 December 2016

Thirteen structurally separate buildings make up the centre. Following the 2016 Kaikōura earthquake, the entire shopping centre closed for urgent safety inspections, partially reopening eleven days later. One building in the northeast corner of the mall, containing the Event Cinema and part of the carpark, was deemed structurally unsafe and was demolished. During the deconstruction of the northeast corner, half of the stores remained closed. The mall was completely reopened on 6 April 2017.

In 2017, a car dealer opened a showroom in the mall, complete with cars for a brief period.

== Cinema and carpark rebuild ==
In 2019, rebuilding of the carpark and cinema commenced. On 17 September 2019, Event Cinemas were confirmed to be the new cinema complex operator. It was also announced that the region's first VMAX movie theatre would open in the site. It was reopened in December 2022.

== Anchor Tenants ==
Queensgate has four anchor tenants.

Farmers has a two-storey store in the centre of the mall.

Woolworths is on the ground floor of the mall, which originally was a Woolworths, prior to rebranding to Countdown, when the mall was redeveloped. However, in 2025, it has since reverted to Woolworths, in line with the company's larger reversion to the Woolworths brand.

In October 2017, H&M opened a two-storey store, their first in Wellington.

In December 2022, Event Cinemas reopened after being demolished due to the 2016 Kaikōura earthquake.

== Transport ==
The centre is located on the corner of Queens Drive and Bunny Street in the centre of Lower Hutt. It is also the location of a major bus interchange (known as Lower Hutt Queensgate) with buses going to Upper Hutt, Waterloo Interchange, Petone, Wainuiomata and Wellington City. The centre is also a short walking distance from Melling railway station which has rail services to Wellington City via Petone/Alicetown. The centre has over 1,855 car park spaces.

== Culture ==
The centre is known for the youths often seen frequenting the southern bus stop. A method used in deterring them is the use of classical music played through loudspeakers.
