= Oaro River =

Coordinates: 42°31′S 173°30′E

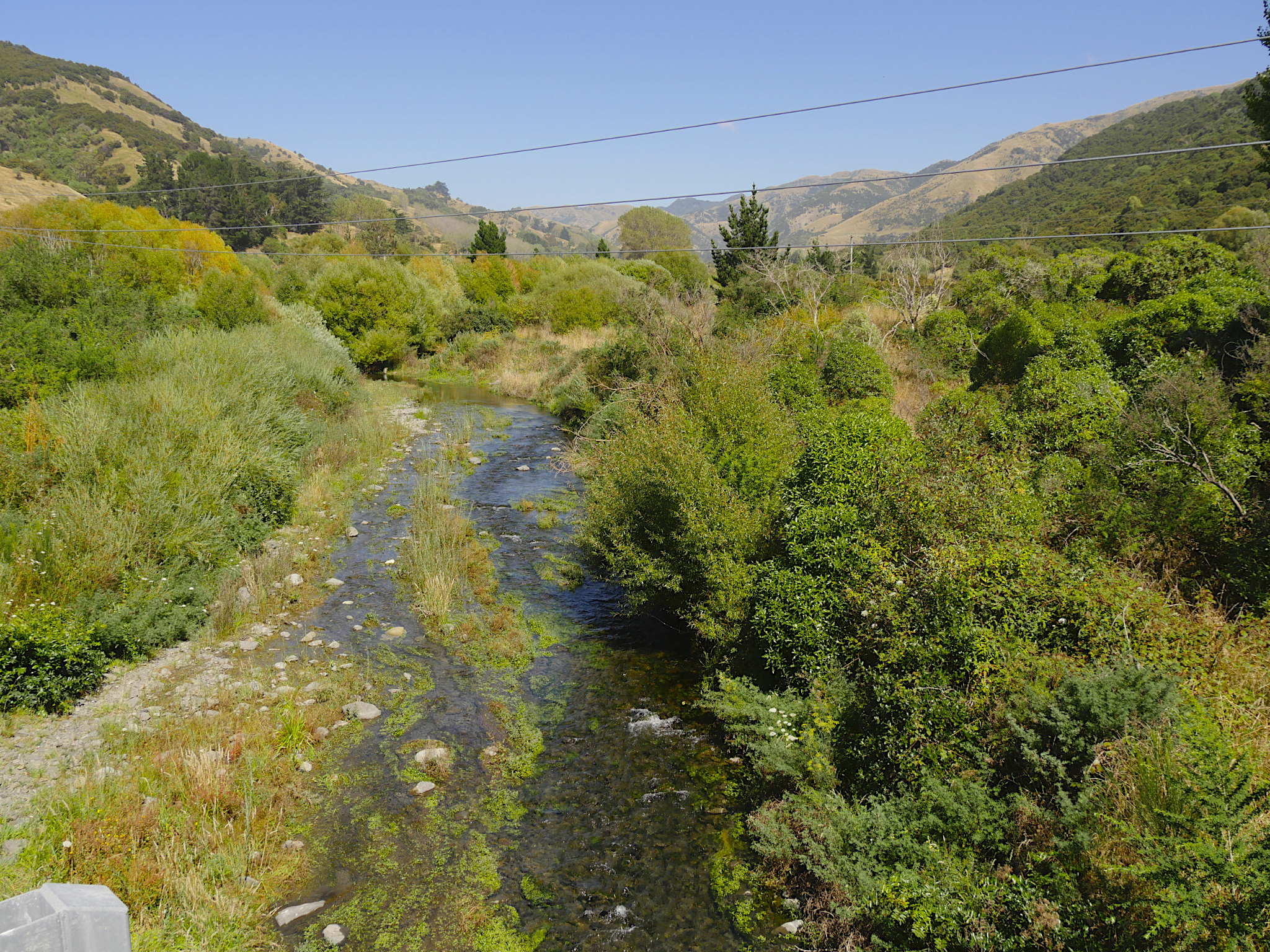

Location
- Country: New Zealand

Physical characteristics
- Mouth
  - location: Pacific Ocean
- Length: 11 km (6.8 mi)

The Oaro River is a river of the north Canterbury region of New Zealand's South Island. It flows south from its sources in the Hundalee Hills, turning east shortly before reaching the coast at Oaro, 15 kilometres (9 mi) southwest of Kaikōura.

== See also ==
- List of rivers of New Zealand
