= Goose Bay, New Zealand =

Locality and bay in Canterbury, New Zealand

- Locality
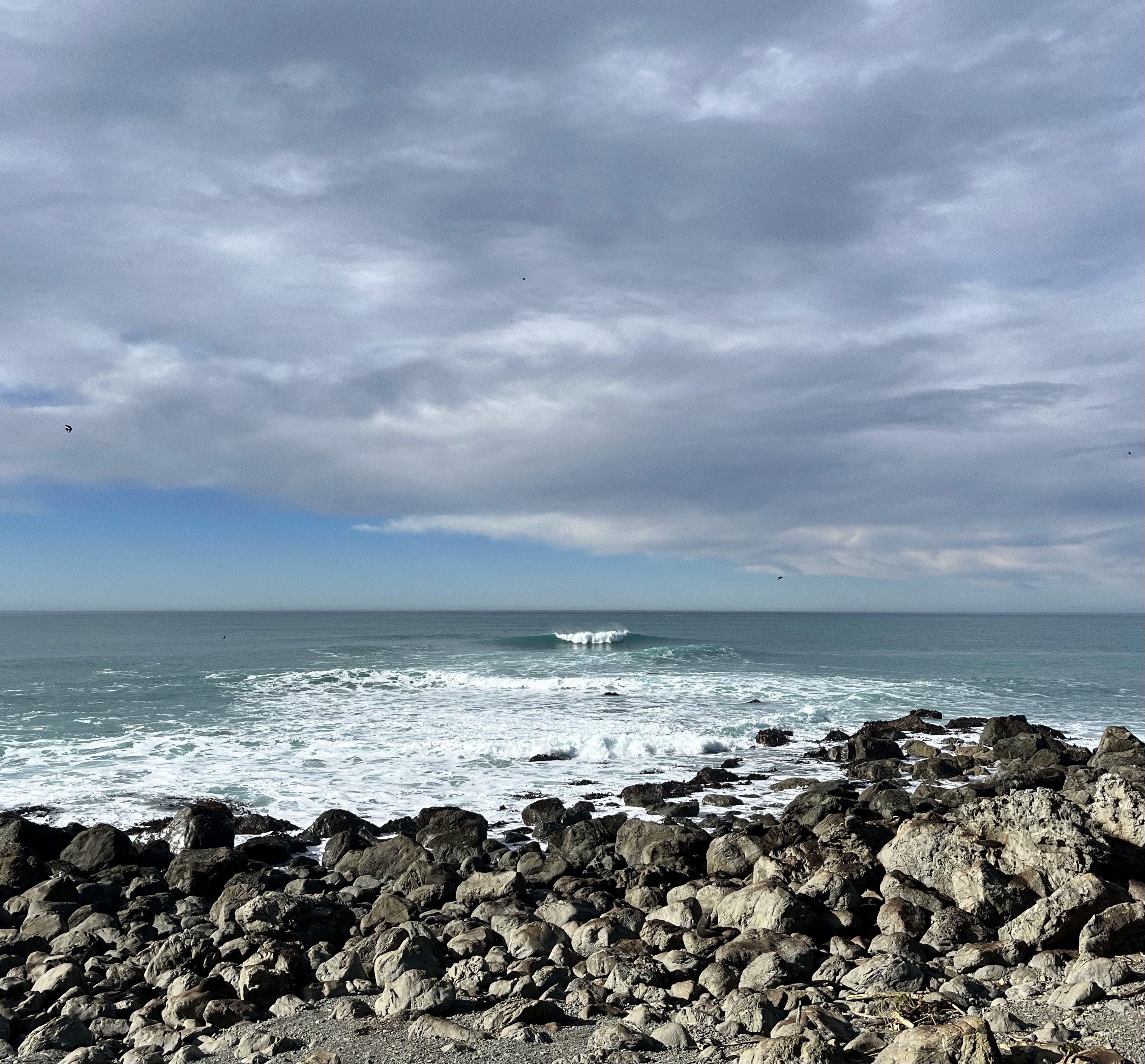
- Goose Bay in 2023
- Interactive map of Goose Bay, New Zealand
- Coordinates: 42°28′44″S 173°31′37″E

Population
  - Total: 32

Goose Bay is a small locality in New Zealand, located 15 kilometres (9.3 mi) southwest of Kaikōura. It is beside a bay that is also named Goose Bay. It was named in the mid-nineteenth century, either after geese that got away from a nearby whaling station or from a Kāinga (Māori village) that was ruined by Te Rauparaha. The Māori name for the bay is Tahuna Torea, literally translating to oystercatcher beach.

Goose Bay is in the Kaikōura District and is a part of the Kaikōura electorate. State Highway 1 goes through the locality. Goose Bay has a volunteer fire brigade.

== Geography ==
The Kaikōura Canyon reaches within a kilometre of the south of Goose Bay. The deep water caused by this canyon results in the bay being a spot where sperm whales are often seen near the coastline.

Ote Makura Stream runs through Goose Bay.

The Ō Tamakura Historic Reserve, formerly known as the Goose Bay-Omihi Scenic Reserve, lies to the south of Goose Bay. It contains a coastal forest of beech and podocarps. It adjoins the Ote Makura scenic reserve, and together they form one of the largest reserves in southern Marlborough.

Bird Rock at Goose Bay is a notable bird nesting area, particularly for red-billed gulls.

== History ==
In Māori tradition, Tahuna Torea/Goose Bay was the home of a chief of the Kati Kuri hapū of Ngāi Tahu named Te Rakaitauneke. He was said to have a guardian whale named Mata Mata, who lived in the sea opposite Te Rakaitauneke’s home in Tahuna Torea. Mata Mata followed the chief up and down the shore and guarded him against harm. Mata Mata was not seen for some time after Te Rakaitauneke died, and people thought he had died of sorrow after his master's death. Te Rakaitauneke had predicted that the whale would return if one of his descendants was in danger, and stories tell that many of the chief's descendants in danger at sea have been saved by a whale since that time.

Goose Bay railway station opened on 15 December 1945 and closed on 16 July 1977.

In January 1979, observers at Goose Bay saw mysterious lights over the water. This was one incident in what came to be known as the Kaikōura Lights.

In 2014 the Hikurangi Marine Reserve was created, 2 kilometres (1.2 mi) north of Goose Bay. In this area, "mining, fishing or harvesting of any kind" are prohibited.

The peak height of the tsunami following the 2016 Kaikōura earthquake was at Goose Bay, with a height of about 7 metres (23 ft). The earthquake caused Goose Bay to rise by 1.4–1.8 metres (4 ft 7 in – 5 ft 11 in). The earthquake also caused a landslide dam at Ote Makura Stream. As a precautionary measure, over 30 homes and baches were evacuated. The dam overtopped in April 2017 due to rainfall caused by ex-Tropical Cyclone Debbie. As a result, the flood threat disappeared. No damage was recorded.

There was a campground in Goose Bay but it was closed around 2021.

== Demographics ==
As of 2026 Goose Bay has an estimated population of 32.

Goose Bay is part of a larger area including Oaro and Pekata and of the still larger Kaikōura Ranges statistical area.
