= Hikurangi Marine Reserve =

New Zealand marine reserve

- IUCN category Ia (strict nature reserve)
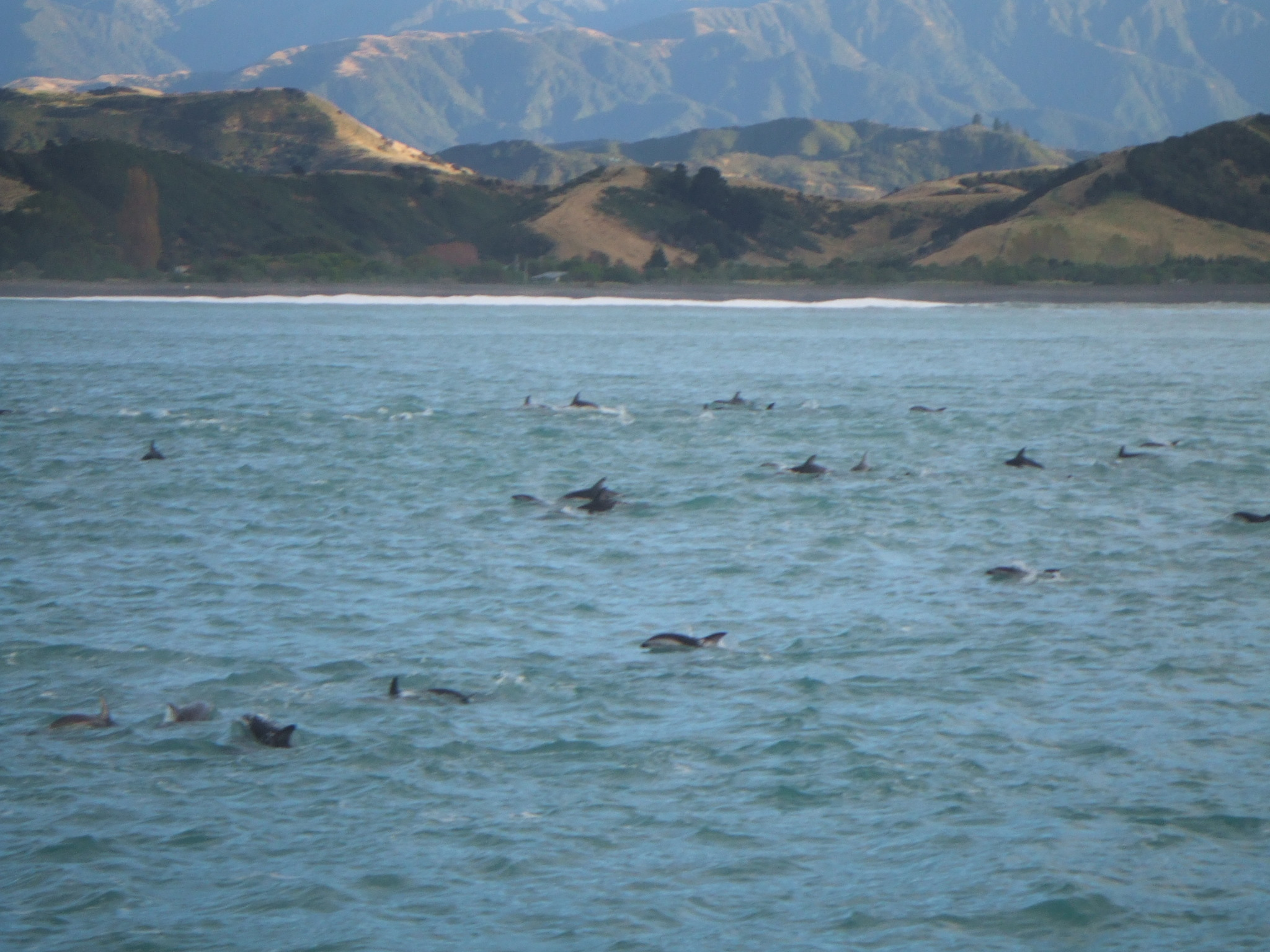
- Dusky dolphins near coast
- Interactive map of Hikurangi Marine Reserve
- Location: Canterbury, New Zealand
- Nearest city: Kaikōura
- Coordinates: 42.4612763°S 173.5424247°E
- Area: 10,416 hectares (25,740 acres)
- Established: 2014
- Governing body: Department of Conservation

Hikurangi Marine Reserve is a marine reserve off the coast of the Kaikōura District, in the Canterbury Region of New Zealand's South Island. It is the largest and deepest marine reserve in New Zealand.

The reserve is covers an area of 10,416 hectares south of the township of Kaikōura. It includes part of the Kaikōura Canyon, a 1000 metre deep side branch of the Hikurangi Trough. It includes a rocky coastline of greywacke boulder and bedrock reefs. Panau Island and two smaller islets are located offshore.

The marine reserve is only available for limited passive recreation. No fishing, harvesting or mining is allowed. However, whales, dolphins and sea birds can be viewed in large numbers.

== History ==
The park was established in 2014.

In November 2016, a magnitude 7.8 earthquake caused submarine mudslides and sediment flows that devastated the deep-sea life in the canyon. Road access to the coast was also affected.

In September 2017, a National Institute of Water and Atmospheric Research expedition found species were recovering faster than expected.

A subsidiary of Talley's Group was convicted and fined for trawling in the marine reserve in March 2019. The company denied the charge, and Talley's denied responsibility.

In October 2023, two divers were caught with 486 pāua collected illegally from the reserve.

== Wildlife ==
The depth of the canyon makes it a food basket for whale, dolphin and sea bird species. Several small rivers and streams provide nutrients from nearby mountains. Cold water from the Southland Current from the Southern Ocean and warm water from the East Cape Current from the subtropics also converge to create a nutrient-rich environment.

The Kaikōura Canyon is the only place where the sperm whale can be viewed closed to the New Zealand mainland. There are significant colonies of New Zealand fur seals, large pods of dusky dolphins and small groups of Hector's dolphins.

Orca regularly visit the area and humpback whales pass through during their northern winter migration. Many other species of whales, albatross, petrel, shearwater and prion also gather in the area regularly.

The coast is the only breeding ground in the world for Hutton's shearwater.

Encrusting and mobile invertebrates like molluscs, crustaceans, echinoderms, anemones and sponges are common on the reefs. Macro-invertebrates like pāua, kina and rock lobster also live around the reefs. Seaweed is common close to shore.

Fish species along the coast include butterfish, blue cod, tarakihi, marblefish, blue moki, red moki, sea perch, wrasse and triplefin. Fish in the deeper waters include rattails, hapuku, tarakihi, ling, hoki, lantern fish, sharks, rays, skates and squid.

The depth of the reserve makes it difficult to survey for wildlife, and very little is known about the deepest areas of the canyon.

== See also ==
- Marine reserves of New Zealand
