= Ōhau Point =

Promontory on South Island, New Zealand

Coordinates: 42.24795°S 173.83079°E

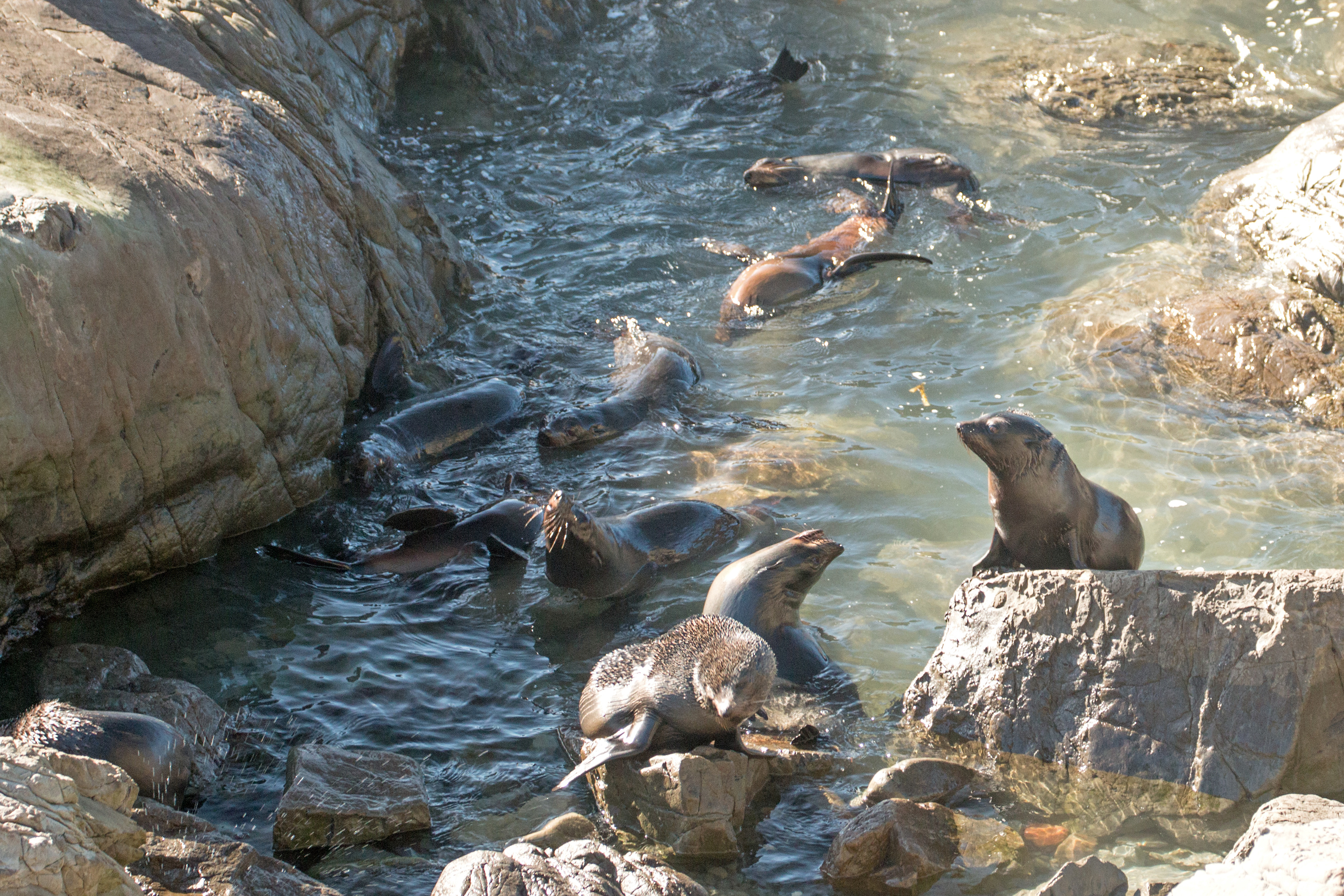
Seal pups in the Ōhau Stream at Ōhau Point

Ōhau Point is a 180 metres (590 ft) high promontory on the east coast of the South Island, New Zealand, approximately 25 km north of Kaikōura. State Highway 1 and the South Island Main Trunk railway line pass the point. It is notable for its colony of New Zealand fur seals, which can be viewed from a public lookout on SH 1. On 14 November 2016, the Kaikōura earthquake caused massive landslides at Ōhau Point, cutting transport routes and affecting wildlife habitats.

== Seal colony ==
Ōhau Point is the location of a large breeding colony of New Zealand fur seals. The number of seals born at the Ōhau Point colony increased from 50 in the mid-1990s to 1500 in 2009. The colony featured in a 2014 David Attenborough documentary series, Life Story.

In March 2014 the Ohau Point New Zealand Fur Seal Sanctuary was created to protect the seals. The sanctuary extends for 700 metres along the coastline around Ōhau Point and 50 metres out to sea, an area of approximately four hectares. The public was banned from accessing the shoreline from the Ōhau Stream to the main seal colony.

The colony's breeding area was destroyed in the Kaikōura earthquake, but the seals quickly colonised new territory to the north and south of the slips and continued to have pups there during the summer of 2016.

== Earthquake damage and repair ==
The Kaikōura earthquake of 14 November 2016 caused numerous landslides and rockfalls along the Kaikōura coastline. One of the biggest landslides occurred at Ōhau Point, where more than 130,000 m^{3} of debris covered State Highway 1 and the Main North LIne of the South Island Main Trunk Railway, blocking one of the South Island's main transport corridors. The NZ Transport Agency and KiwiRail established the North Canterbury Transport Infrastructure Recovery (NCTIR) alliance in order to reopen the transport route as quickly as possible. The railway line and road were realigned nearer the shore.

Tunnel 19 on the South Island Main Trunk is a curved, 536 metre-long tunnel through Ōhau Point. Both ends of the tunnel were blocked by rockfalls which took ten months to clear away. Once the tunnel was usable, road work crews used it to walk from one side of the work area to the other. Freight services on the Main North Line resumed on 15 September 2017.

SH 1 previously wound around the slope of the bluff at the point, but it was decided to build an embankment and concrete seawall and reroute the road lower down around the base of Ōhau Point. The road design included a new parking area and lookout so that people can stop to view the New Zealand fur seal colony on the rocks directly below the point. The lookout opened in October 2018. The former road became a catch bench (a flat area to catch rock and debris falling down the hillside).

During the road reconstruction project NCTIR had a large environmental team which made efforts to protect seals at the colony. More than 11,000 seals were moved by handlers working 24 hours a day monitoring the coastline near the roadworks, and in some places large blocks were temporarily installed to keep seals away from the works. Although the New Zealand fur seal is protected under the Marine Mammals Protection Act, road builders were given permission to kill or injure seals during the road works so that the workers would have legal protection in case any seals were accidentally harmed during the project.

=== Waterfall pool ===
Until November 2016, there was a pool at the base of Ōhau Falls on the bluff at Ōhau Point which was notable as a spot where seal pups liked to play. The waterfall is on privately owned land surrounded on three sides by the Ka Whata Tu O Rakihouia Conservation Park, and is managed by the Department of Conservation (DOC). In 2010 it was estimated that 40,000 people visited the waterfall each year to watch up to a hundred seal pups playing in the stream and pool at the base of the falls while their mothers fished at sea, and DOC said the waterfall was one of the most visited outdoor sites in the South Island. The pool was destroyed in the 2016 Kaikōura earthquake when the cliff above it collapsed, and the walkway to the pool was closed after the earthquake as it was no longer viable. Seals still visit the stream and waterfall.

== Ōhau rock daisy ==
The Ōhau rock daisy is a plant which grows only on the bluffs around the point. The population of the daisy was reduced by 95%, to about 100 plants, after the hillsides collapsed in the 2016 earthquake. Abseilers collected seeds from six of the surviving plants. Around 200 plants were raised from the seeds at the Titoki nursery in Brightwater near Nelson, with the aim of planting them out on the hillside at Ōhau Point. In June 2018, fifty plants were planted back at Ōhau Point, and there were plans to plant 67 of the propagated seedlings alongside the rebuilt transport route at Ōhau Point, with the expectation that seeds from these plants would blow onto the bluff and germinate.

== Spotted shag colony ==
There is also a breeding colony of spotted shags at Ōhau Point.
