= Oaro =

- town
- Interactive map of Oaro
- Coordinates: 42°31′00″S 173°30′20″E
- Country: New Zealand
- Region: Canterbury
- Territorial authority: Kaikōura District
- Electorates: Kaikōura; Te Tai Tonga (Māori)

Government
  - Territorial Authority: Kaikōura District Council
  - Kaikōura District Mayor: Craig Mackle
  - Kaikōura MP: Stuart Smith
  - Te Tai Tonga MP: Tākuta Ferris

Area
  - Total: 11.01 km^{2} (4.25 sq mi)

Population (2023 census)
  - Total: 36
  - Density: 3.3/km^{2} (8.5/sq mi)
- Time zone: UTC+12 (New Zealand Standard Time)
  - Summer (DST): UTC+13 (New Zealand Daylight Time)
- Postcode: 7374

Oaro is a settlement close to the Pacific Ocean Coast of north Canterbury, in the South Island of New Zealand.

Oaro is within Kaikōura District on State Highway 1 and on the South Island Main Trunk railway, 20 kilometres south of Kaikōura. It lies on a small flood plain close to the mouth of the Oaro River, which reaches the ocean just to the north of Oaro. The headland of Piripāua (Spyglass Point) and the associated Haumuri Bluff are located just to the south of the settlement.

There is some conjecture about Oaro's etymology, though it is definitely Māori; it has been suggested that it could mean "the place at the front", "the place of swamp", or "the place of a wish". Alternatively it could mean "The place of Aro", which may have been the name of a prominent local Māori individual.

The area around Oaro was badly affected by the 2016 Kaikōura earthquake, with a tsunami height estimated at 5.3 m ± 0.3 m.

== Demographics ==
Oaro locality covers 11.01 km^{2} (4.25 sq mi) It had a population of 36 people in the 2023 census.

Oaro is part of a larger area incorporating Goose Bay and Peketā, which covers 124.22 km^{2} (47.96 sq mi) which is itself part of Kaikōura Ranges statistical area.

Historical population for the area including Goose Bay and Peketa
Year	Pop.	±% p.a.
2013	198	—
2018	171	−2.89%
2023	195	+2.66%

The area had a population of 195 in the 2023 New Zealand census, an increase of 24 people (14.0%) since the 2018 census, and a decrease of 3 people (−1.5%) since the 2013 census. There were 108 males and 87 females in 81 dwellings. 1.5% of people identified as LGBTIQ+. The median age was 61.9 years (compared with 38.1 years nationally). There were 12 people (6.2%) aged under 15 years, 18 (9.2%) aged 15 to 29, 84 (43.1%) aged 30 to 64, and 78 (40.0%) aged 65 or older.

People could identify as more than one ethnicity. The results were 86.2% European (Pākehā); 16.9% Māori; 1.5% Pasifika; 1.5% Asian; and 3.1% Middle Eastern, Latin American and African New Zealanders (MELAA). English was spoken by 98.5%, Māori by 1.5%, and other languages by 4.6%. New Zealand Sign Language was known by 1.5%. The percentage of people born overseas was 9.2, compared with 28.8% nationally.

Religious affiliations were 24.6% Christian, 1.5% Māori religious beliefs, and 1.5% other religions. People who answered that they had no religion were 63.1%, and 7.7% of people did not answer the census question.

Of those at least 15 years old, 18 (9.8%) people had a bachelor's or higher degree, 105 (57.4%) had a post-high school certificate or diploma, and 57 (31.1%) people exclusively held high school qualifications. The median income was $25,000, compared with $41,500 nationally. 6 people (3.3%) earned over $100,000 compared to 12.1% nationally. The employment status of those at least 15 was 60 (32.8%) full-time, 30 (16.4%) part-time, and 3 (1.6%) unemployed.
