= 2016 Kaikōura earthquake =

Earthquake in New Zealand

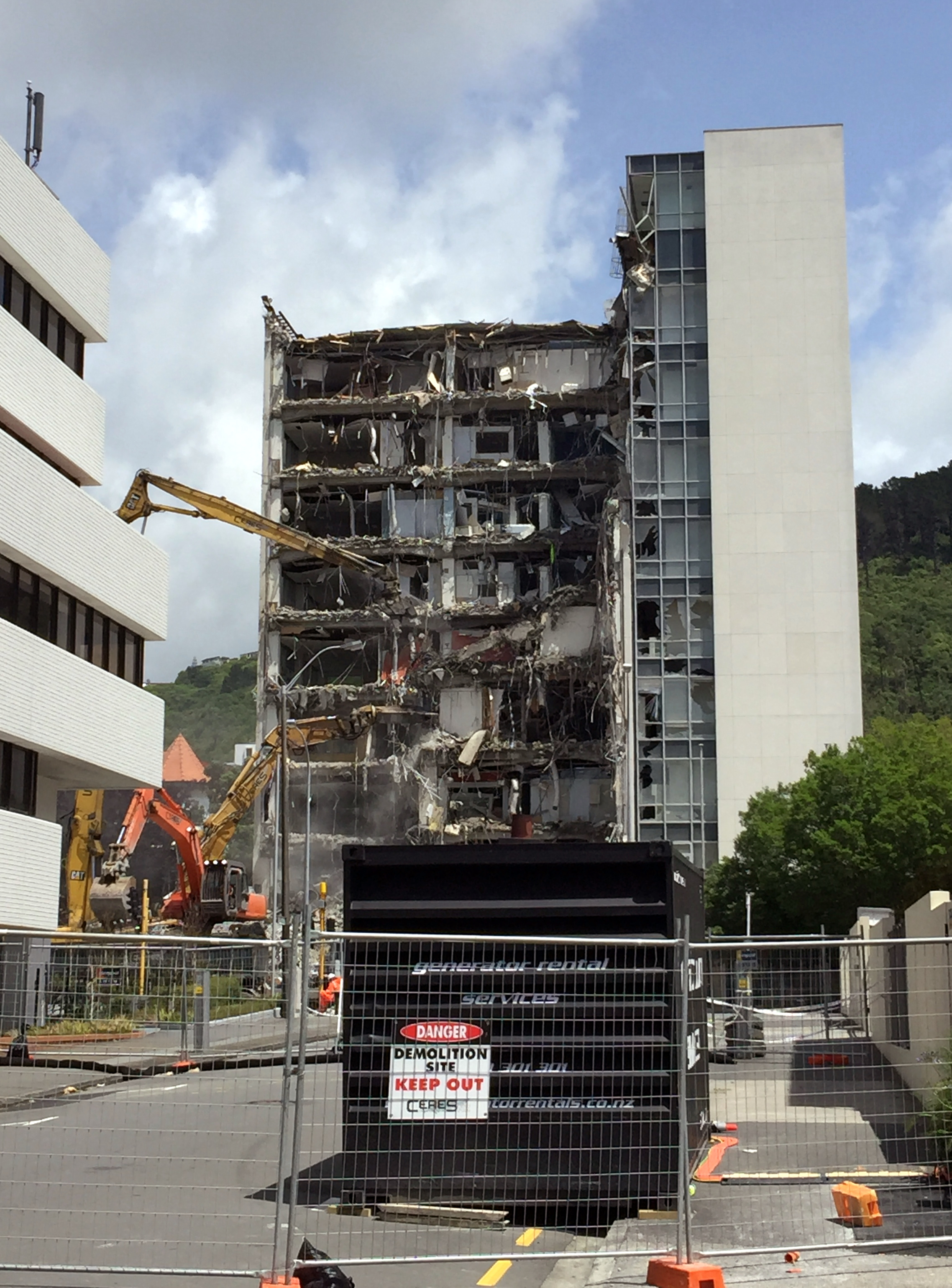
- Demolition of 61 Molesworth Street in Wellington

- Location within New Zealand
- UTC time: 2016-11-13 11:02:56
- ISC event: 615035032
- USGS-ANSS: ComCat
- Local date: 14 November 2016
- Local time: 00:02:56 NZDT
- Duration: ~2 minutes
- Magnitude: 7.8 M_{w}
- Depth: 15.1 km (9.4 mi)
- Epicentre: 42.737°S 173.054°E; 15 km (9.3 mi) north-east of Culverden
- Type: Oblique-slip
- Areas affected: New Zealand
- Total damage: US$1.62 billion (insurance loss)
- Max. intensity: MMI IX (Violent)
- Peak acceleration: 3.23 g
- Tsunami: Up to 7 m (23 ft) in Goose Bay
- Landslides: Yes
- Aftershocks: >20,200 (as of 22 November 2017)
- Casualties: 2 dead 57 injured

Map of Kaikōura earthquakes

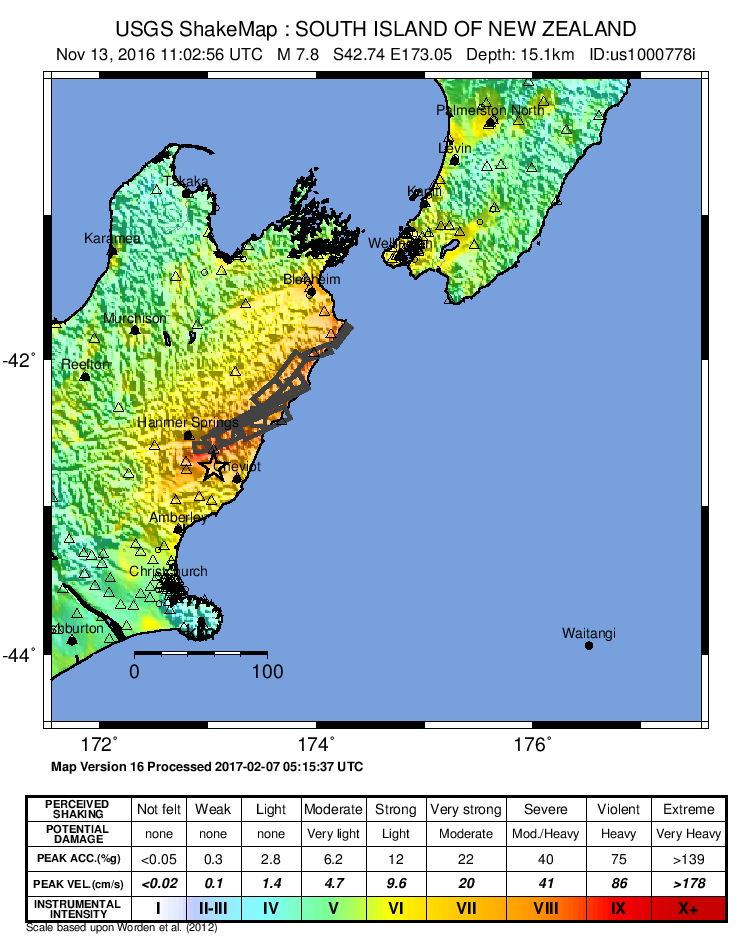
USGS ShakeMap for the event

The 2016 Kaikōura earthquake was a M_{w} 7.8 earthquake in the South Island of New Zealand that occurred two minutes after midnight on 14 November 2016 NZDT (11:02 on 13 November UTC). Ruptures occurred on multiple faults and the earthquake has been described as the "most complex earthquake ever studied". It has been subsequently modelled as having a megathrust component set off by an adjacent rupture on the Humps Fault. It was the second largest earthquake in New Zealand since European settlement.

The earthquake started at about 15 kilometres (9 mi) north-east of Culverden and 60 kilometres (37 mi) south-west of the tourist town of Kaikōura and at a depth of approximately 15 kilometres (9.3 miles). The complex sequence of ruptures lasted about two minutes. The cumulative magnitude of the ruptures was 7.8, with the largest amount of that energy released far to the north of the epicentre.

Over 45,000 insurance claims were received, resulting in a loss of NZ$2.27 billion (US$1.62 billion). There were two deaths, in Kaikōura and Mount Lyford.

== Earthquake ==
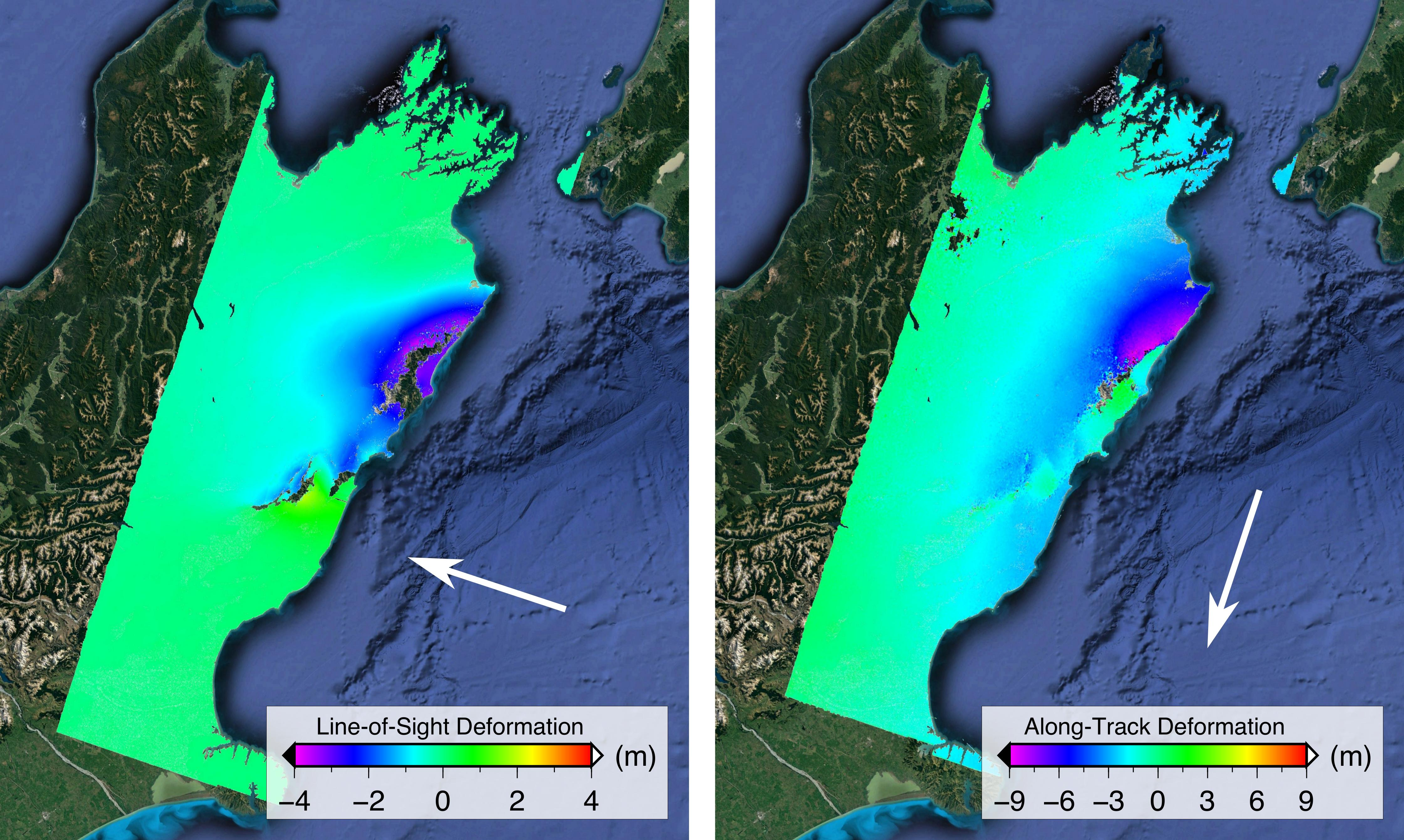
Satellite radar image showing ground motion effects during the earthquake

A complex sequence of ruptures with a combined magnitude of 7.8 started at 00:02:56 NZDT on 14 November 2016 and lasted approximately two minutes. The hypocentre (the point where the ruptures started) was at a depth of 15 kilometres (9.3 miles). The epicentre (the point on the Earth's surface above the hypocentre) was 15 kilometres (9 mi) north-east of Culverden and 95 km (59 mi) from Christchurch. From the hypocentre associated with the Humps Fault, ruptures ripped northwards at a speed of 2 km/s (1.2 mi/s), over a distance of up to 200 km (120 mi). The largest amount of energy released did not occur at the epicentre, rather 100 km (62 mi) to the north near Seddon. Initial field surveys indicated ruptures on at least six faults, while more detailed studies confirmed ruptures on twenty-five faults. This is considered a world record for the greatest number of faults to rupture in a single earthquake event. The earthquake was assessed as the "most complex earthquake ever studied" and prompted the reassessment of a number of assumptions about earthquake processes. For example, the likely contribution of underground overpressured fluid to the propagation observed required data collection and reanalysis with new earthquake models not available to initial researchers.

There was motion on the Kekerengu Fault of up to 12.0 m (39.4 ft) ± 0.7 m (2 ft 4 in), movement on the linkage Hundalee Fault of up to 2.5 m (8.2 ft) vertically and horizontally 3.7 m (12 ft), a newly identified fault in Waipapa Bay, as well as minor motion on the Seaward segment of the Hope Fault, and rupture on the Humps Fault and in the Emu Plains area. The offshore continuation of the Kekerengu Fault to the north east, known as the Needles Fault, ruptured as well. NIWA marine geologist Philip Barnes said the Kekerengu–Needles Fault rupture may extend for about 70 km (43 mi), consisting of 36 km (22 mi) on land and 34 km (21 mi) under the sea.

Cape Campbell, at the north-eastern tip of the South Island, moved to the north-north-east by more than two metres – putting it that much closer to the North Island – and rose almost one metre. Kaikōura moved to the north-east by nearly one metre, and rose seventy centimetres. The east coast of the North Island moved west by up to five centimetres, and the Wellington Region moved two to six centimetres to the north. Christchurch moved two centimetres to the south.

== Tsunami ==
The tsunami that followed the Kaikōura earthquake reached a peak height of about 7 metres (23 ft). The tsunami was found to be highest at Goose Bay, with data indicating a maximum run-up height above tide level at the time of the tsunami of 6.9 m ± 0.3 m. At Oaro, the height was 5.3 m ± 0.3 m. Marine and freshwater flora and fauna were later found scattered across the Oaro River flood plain, extending 250 metres (820 ft) inland from the high tide mark on the day of the survey.

A tsunami estimated at five metres high struck the north-facing Little Pigeon Bay on Banks Peninsula. The bay contained only one building, an unoccupied holiday house that was pushed off its foundations and heavily damaged. In neighbouring Pigeon Bay, the tsunami was observed at about 2 am but caused no damage. In general, tsunami damage along the Kaikōura coast was minor because it happened at mid to low tide, beaches in the area are steep and much of the coastline had been lifted up during the earthquake.

== Casualties ==
Two people died in the earthquake. A man was crushed and died when the historic Elms Farm homestead near Kaikōura collapsed. Two other people were rescued from the rubble of the house, including the man's 100-year-old mother. A woman died in a log house that was damaged at Mount Lyford. Early reports said her cause of death was a heart attack, but an autopsy later indicated that she died from a head injury suffered during the earthquake.

== Damage ==
=== Road and rail ===
The earthquake caused "tens of thousands" of landslides. Many major roads were closed in the South Island because of slips and damage to bridges, including State Highway 1 (SH 1) between Picton and Waipara and State Highway 7 between Waipara and Springs Junction (SH 65 turnoff). Most roads were cleared within 24 hours, but SH 1 between Seddon and Cheviot via Kaikōura and the Inland Kaikōura Road were closed for longer. The closure of SH 1, the Inland Kaikōura Road and the Main North Line railway effectively cut off all land routes into Kaikōura. Parts of diversion routes via State Highways 6, 63, 65 and 7 carried four times their usual traffic volume.

On 30 November 2016, the Inland Kaikōura Road, redesignated "Kaikōura Emergency Access Road", was reopened to civilian drivers holding a permit and for restricted times of the day. Twenty-five crews had worked to clear 50 landslips on that highway alone. It reopened unrestricted to all traffic on 19 December 2016.

State Highway 1 south of Kaikōura reopened on 21 December 2016, albeit only during daylight hours. Repair of the highway north of Kaikōura took substantially longer, with the repaired highway opening over a year later on 15 December 2017.

One of the biggest landslides occurred at Ōhau Point, where more than 130,000 m^{3} (4,600,000 cu ft) of debris covered State Highway 1 and the Main North Line of the South Island Main Trunk railway, blocking one of the South Island's main transport corridors. The NZ Transport Agency and KiwiRail established the North Canterbury Transport Infrastructure Recovery (NCTIR) alliance in order to reopen the transport route as quickly as possible. Both ends of Tunnel 19 on the South Island Main Trunk through Ōhau Point were blocked by rockfalls which took ten months to clear away. Freight services on the Main North Line resumed on 15 September 2017. The railway line and road were realigned nearer the shore at Ōhau Point. SH 1 previously wound around the slope of the bluff at the point, but it was decided to build an embankment and concrete seawall and reroute the road lower down around the base of Ōhau Point. The former road became a catch bench (a flat area to catch rocks and debris falling down the hillside).

The long term closure of State Highway 1 north of Kaikōura (between Mangamaunu and Clarence) resulted in a detour through the Lewis Pass being the only major route from Picton to Christchurch. This highway had to be upgraded significantly due to this increased usage.

The section of the Main North Line rail link from Picton south to Lake Grassmere reopened on 16 January 2017. Although freight services from Picton through to Christchurch resumed on 15 September 2017, passenger service did not resume until 1 December 2018 due to continued landslides and repair work. In late 2020 rebuilding and strengthening of the road and rail between Clarence and Oaro was finished, at a cost of NZ$1.25 billion (US$890 million).

=== Kaikōura ===
Kaikōura was cut off by road due to landslides, damaged bridges and infrastructure, road subsidence, and the risk of falling debris. The earthquake led to the physical isolation of Kaikōura for some time, which had significant effects in a town reliant on tourism. Some smaller tourism operators were unable to get District Council support or government grants to survive for over a year without visitors. Farmers were unable to transport their produce, and the local fishery was closed due to fear of contaminated runoff from the land.

Mains water supply was mostly restored to Kaikōura township by 19 November, but supply was in a "fragile state" and conservation was necessary. The sewage system was "severely damaged" and unusable.

=== Kaikōura harbour ===
The earthquake lifted the seabed around the Kaikōura coastline. At the marina at South Bay, the seabed lifted by more than 1 metre (3 ft 3 in), leading to vessels resting on rock at low tide. Whale Watch Kaikōura and Encounter Kaikōura suspended their operations. By 31 December 2016, Whale Watch had trialled a modified trailer that could launch its vessel Tohora in the marina, and began whale watching trips again, operating one tour each day with only one boat, and limited to periods around high tide. Whale Watch reported that they were operating at only 20 per cent of their capability, and that there had been a 60 per cent fall in visitor numbers. The Hurunui/Kaikōura Earthquakes Emergency Relief Act 2016 provided a modified resource consent process that enabled a shortened process for consenting works needed to restore the harbour. Excavation work in the harbour began in late December with government funding of $5 million and a subsequent contribution of $1 million from the Kaikōura District Council, Whale Watch and Encounter Kaikōura. The excavation and reconstruction of the harbour was originally expected to take a year, but was completed in nine months, with an official re-opening on 14 November 2017.

=== Ecological disturbance ===
Uplift along the coast at Kaikōura (up to 6 metres) exposed the intertidal zone, which resulted in a large-scale die off of many organisms including Durvillaea bull kelp. The loss of Durvillaea kelp caused ecological disturbance, significantly affecting the biodiversity of the local intertidal community. Aerial drone imaging two years after the earthquake indicated that Durvillaea abundance remained low on reefs with significant uplift, but it revealed offshore refuge populations less frequently detected by field researchers. Genomic research sampling of D. antarctica populations before and after the 2016 earthquake indicates that the original populations have managed to survive and are dominating the initial recolonisation process along the newly formed intertidal coastline. However, D. antarctica remains sparse and further change in genetic diversity is possible over the next coming decades.

Pāua were especially affected by the uplift of the Kaikōura coastline because their habitat is close to shore. In the days immediately after the earthquake, volunteers moved between 20,000 and 56,000 kilos of pāua from the uplifted rocks where they were stranded, back into the water. Affected areas were closed to all pāua harvesting after the earthquake to allow the species to recover. Commercial harvesters and divers had their Total Allowable Commercial Catch (TACC) halved, which caused financial pressure for small family-owned businesses. The fishery reopened for three months from December 2021 to February 2022, and after analysis of this period the fishery reopened to recreational and commercial harvesting in 2023.

The Hutton's shearwater (Puffinus huttoni) colony in the Seaward Kaikōura ranges was extensively damaged by the earthquake. Large landslides buried up to 20% of the existing colony areas. Extensive shaking damaged the integrity of many burrows in the remaining shingle and soil tussock-covered habitat used by these alpine nesting seabirds. The birds were at the peak of egg laying in mid-November and with the quake happening at midnight there would have been considerable losses of birds nesting within breeding burrows. The earthquake also buried one of the two boulders remaining inhabited by the eyelash seaweed, with the condition of the other 4 km (2.5 mi) away being unknown. The species has not been found in the wild since the earthquake, and it may now be extinct.

=== Wellington ===
Buildings were damaged in Wellington, some beyond repair. Damage to docks briefly halted ferry traffic across Cook Strait, and container shipping did not resume for over ten months because of damage to the container terminal. Wellington City Council was given special powers to require reports from building owners, and there were doubts about application of the rules. By February 2017, business insurance claims had passed NZ$900 million (US$641 million). The Wellington Region had two thirds (65%) of the total losses, followed by the upper South Island at 25%, Canterbury at 8% and the remaining 2% from elsewhere in the North Island.

Several buildings were closed temporarily because of doubts about stairwells. In Lower Hutt, a cinema complex and part of the carpark in the Queensgate Shopping Centre were deemed unsafe and were demolished. At Ava railway station, one of the pedestrian access ramps was damaged and was removed during the weekend of 17 and 18 December, leaving the station without wheelchair access until the ramp was rebuilt and reopened in October 2018.

A 54-year-old nine-storey office block, the former ICI Building at 61 Molesworth Street, was demolished during December 2016 after fears that it could collapse, and was replaced with a new 11-storey office building that opened in 2025. The damaged Reading Cinema parking building off Courtenay Place was demolished during January 2017. Both building failures resulted in part of adjacent streets (Molesworth Street and Tory Street) being closed off for a period. The Courtenay Central Reading Cinema complex closed due to minor damage, reopened in March 2017 then closed again on 5 January 2019 after further assessment. As of February 2026 it is still standing but closed. In 2016 and 2017 it was decided that several other buildings would be demolished, not repaired, including the Figaro Block of the Malvina Major Retirement Village in Burma Road, Johnsonville.

Several buildings constructed only in the previous decade failed because of unsatisfactory design features or collapse of building services. Amongst these were the eleven year old, seven-storey NZDF headquarters and Statistics House, built in 2005 on the waterfront. BNZ Harbour Quays, a large building on Waterloo Quay leased to the BNZ, was badly damaged in the earthquake, and in 2018 the building's owner CentrePort announced that it would be demolished. This building was opened in 2009 and demolished during 2019. BNZ then sued the Wellington City Council for negligence for granting building consents and issuing code compliance certificates, since concerns about the building's design had been raised by reviewing engineers before construction began. The building had previously suffered damage during the 2013 Seddon earthquake.

Wellington Central Library (opened in 1991) was not damaged during the Kaikōura earthquake but closed suddenly on 19 March 2019 after engineers reassessed it in light of new understanding about building performance gained from the 2016 quake. The building was gutted, strengthened and redesigned with an extra floor and reopened in March 2026. Demolition of the Civic Administration Building in Te Ngākau Civic Square started in April 2024 and was completed in February 2025.

== Other effects ==
Several houses in the coastal suburb of New Brighton in Christchurch were looted after the occupants left because of tsunami risk.

Schools and universities across the Canterbury Region were told to remain closed until the situation could be assessed, affecting the end-of-year NCEA and New Zealand Scholarship examinations for secondary school students. Exams on the day of the earthquake were cancelled in many schools, including in all of Wellington. Students received derived grades for any NCEA exams due to be taken the week of the earthquake. Due to New Zealand Scholarship being a competitive award and not having a derived grade process, the history and chemistry exams scheduled for 14 November were instead postponed to a later date.

Three cows became stranded on an 'island' of grass after the surrounding ground was swept away. They made international news and have been described as celebrities. In 2017 the cows' owner published a children's book about them.

== Response ==
Prime Minister John Key surveyed the damage from the air and later described the scenes as "utter devastation" and estimated that reconstruction would take months and cost billions of dollars.

There were about 1,200 tourists and 2,000 residents in Kaikōura when the earthquake struck. Those not evacuated immediately were looked after by local residents. About 90 people slept at Takahanga Marae on the night following the earthquake, and 30 slept on pews at St Paul's Presbyterian Church. Others stayed with local people. Takahanga Marae, assisted by volunteers from local businesses, provided meals for up to 900 people. Ngāi Tahu donated 1.5 tonnes of crayfish which would otherwise have spoiled after electricity failures, and local supermarkets donated other supplies.

The New Zealand Defence Force dispatched five Royal New Zealand Air Force helicopters (four NH90s and one Agusta A109), a P-3 Orion and a C-130 Hercules to survey and provide essential emergency supplies to the most severely affected areas around Kaikōura. Kaikoura Aerodrome was too small to take larger multi-engine aircraft so the landing was limited to helicopters and small aircraft. The Royal New Zealand Navy's multi-role vessel HMNZS Canterbury and off-shore patrol vessel HMNZS Wellington were deployed to Kaikōura to provide aid supplies and evacuate people. HMCS Vancouver, HMAS Darwin and USS Sampson, in New Zealand waters for the RNZN's 75th birthday celebrations in Auckland, were redirected by their respective governments to assist. A United States Navy P-3 Orion of VP-47 and two Kawasaki P-1s of the Japan Maritime Self-Defense Force's Air Patrol Squadron 3, also visiting RNZAF Base Whenuapai for the RNZN 75th anniversary events, were deployed to assist. The New Zealand Defence Force also deployed HMNZS Te Kaha and HMNZS Endeavour to support the operation.

Nearly 200 people had been airlifted out of Kaikōura by late evening on 15 November, with about 1,000 still to be evacuated on the following morning. Stranded tourists with health issues and travel plans were put on a flight priority list. HMNZS Canterbury arrived in Kaikōura on 16 November and transported about 450 evacuees, four dogs, and seven tonnes of luggage to Lyttelton, arriving early the following morning. On the morning of 20 November, HMNZS Canterbury arrived at Lyttelton with another group of evacuees, bringing the total number evacuated from Kaikōura to more than 900.

The New Zealand Fire Service dispatched urban search and rescue teams to Wellington and Kaikōura. Paramedics were dispatched from St John.

The earthquake occurred on the same day as a supermoon, which caused some speculation that the Moon caused, or increased the likelihood of, the earthquake. Scientific analysis shows that the Moon does not influence earthquakes.

=== Changes to building code ===
The failure of BNZ Harbour Quays, Statistics House and other Wellington buildings that were damaged in the earthquake led to revision of seismic assessment guidelines. The Ministry of Business, Industry and Employment (MBIE) released The Seismic Assessment of Existing Buildings, commonly known as the Red Book, in July 2017. These guidelines provide "a technical basis for engineers to carry out seismic assessments of existing buildings". Section C5 deals with assessment of multi-storey concrete buildings. In 2018, section C5 was revised because understanding of building performance in the Kaikōura earthquake had changed. The revised section is known as the Yellow Book or Yellow Chapter. Assessment using the Yellow Book can lead to different results from assessment using the Red Book, but only the Red Book has legal standing. Wellington Central Library and Courtenay Central cinema complex were closed in 2019 after assessment under the Yellow Book guidelines. The differences in the two versions of the guidelines have led to confusion and frustration for building owners and engineers and contributed to a shortage of commercial rental properties in Wellington, as renters demand seismically safe buildings.

== Aftershocks ==
Magnitude of Kaikōura earthquakes

Number of aftershocks within 200 km of Kaikōura

Aftershocks ≥ M5.0
Date	Time (NZDT)	Magnitude	Depth	Epicentre	Ref
14 November 2016	00:02:56	7.8	15 km (9 mi)	15 km northeast of Culverden	
14 November 2016	00:16:10	5.0	2 km (1 mi)	5 km west of Culverden	
14 November 2016	00:19:32	5.3	12 km (7 mi)	45 km north of Kaikōura	
14 November 2016	00:24:17	5.5	12 km (7 mi)	40 km north of Kaikōura	
14 November 2016	00:32:06	6.2	29 km (18 mi)	15 km north of Kaikōura	
14 November 2016	00:33:49	5.5	6 km (4 mi)	25 km southeast of Seddon	
14 November 2016	00:41:48	5.6	9 km (6 mi)	20 km southeast of Seddon	
14 November 2016	00:52:44	6.1	32 km (20 mi)	25 km north of Kaikōura	
14 November 2016	01:03:53	5.1	9 km (6 mi)	15 km southeast of Seddon	
14 November 2016	01:04:21	5.1	10 km (6 mi)	15 km southeast of Wellington	
14 November 2016	01:20:41	5.0	30 km (19 mi)	25 km northeast of Kaikōura	
14 November 2016	01:25:55	5.3	30 km (19 mi)	10 km north of Culverden	
14 November 2016	01:27:59	5.2	30 km (19 mi)	10 km northeast of Kaikōura	
14 November 2016	01:38:38	5.3	7 km (4 mi)	15 km east of Seddon	
14 November 2016	02:21:11	5.8	0 km (0 mi)	25 km southeast of Seddon	
14 November 2016	02:31:26	6.0	25 km (16 mi)	15 km north of Kaikōura	
14 November 2016	02:50:01	5.0	8 km (5 mi)	20 km southeast of Seddon	
14 November 2016	03:04:04	5.1	38 km (24 mi)	35 km north of Cheviot	
14 November 2016	04:33:03	5.5	16 km (10 mi)	20 km southeast of Seddon	
14 November 2016	06:17:39	5.1	9 km (6 mi)	Within 5 km of Kaikōura	
14 November 2016	07:34:26	5.2	23 km (14 mi)	20 km southeast of Seddon	
14 November 2016	07:59:10	5.4	51 km (32 mi)	20 km northeast of Kaikōura	
14 November 2016	09:22:14	5.0	27 km (17 mi)	15 km northeast of Kaikōura	
14 November 2016	09:51:21	5.1	82 km (51 mi)	40 km northeast of Hanmer Springs	
14 November 2016	11:19:32	5.2	45 km (28 mi)	35 km east of Hanmer Springs	
14 November 2016	12:17:32	5.2	27 km (17 mi)	35 km northeast of Kaikōura	
14 November 2016	12:49:11	5.2	13 km (8 mi)	25 km east of Seddon	
14 November 2016	13:34:22	6.7	35 km (22 mi)	30 km southwest of Kaikōura	
14 November 2016	14:28:22	5.2	35 km (22 mi)	30 km southwest of Kaikōura	
14 November 2016	14:30:14	5.4	45 km (28 mi)	30 km southwest of Kaikōura	
14 November 2016	18:16:31	5.2	55 km (34 mi)	30 km southwest of Kaikōura	
14 November 2016	19:43:00	5.6	23 km (14 mi)	30 km southwest of Kaikōura	
14 November 2016	19:47:52	5.7	53 km (33 mi)	30 km southwest of Kaikōura	
14 November 2016	20:21:04	5.8	23 km (14 mi)	30 km southwest of Kaikōura	
14 November 2016	22:49:56	5.0	8 km (5 mi)	30 km southwest of Kaikōura	
15 November 2016	00:16:42	5.0	25 km (16 mi)	15 km east of Seddon	
15 November 2016	08:17:33	5.1	19 km (12 mi)	15 km north of Kaikōura	
15 November 2016	14:34:45	5.8	4 km (2 mi)	15 km east of Seddon	
15 November 2016	14:43:52	5.2	12 km (7 mi)	15 km east of Seddon	
15 November 2016	18:09:27	5.3	7 km (4 mi)	15 km northwest of Kaikōura	
15 November 2016	19:30:33	5.8	7 km (4 mi)	20 north of Kaikōura	
17 November 2016	10:05:00	5.0	22 km (14 mi)	10 km southeast of Seddon	
19 November 2016	03:22:58	5.3	21 km (13 mi)	20 km northeast of Cheviot	
22 November 2016	18:13:34	5.8	21 km (13 mi)	15 km southeast of Culverden	
4 December 2016	16:15:47	5.5	12 km (7 mi)	10 km east of Seddon	
29 December 2016	15:34:33	5.6	15 km (9 mi)	35 km east of Seddon	
6 January 2017	00:17:33	5.4	13 km (8 mi)	20 km southwest of Seddon	
11 January 2017	13:19:22	5.1	11 km (7 mi)	15 km east of Seddon	
1 February 2017	23:21:29	5.1	16 km (10 mi)	10 km northeast of Kaikōura	
12 February 2017	09:18:54	5.2	9 km (6 mi)	15 km northwest of Culverden	
2 March 2017	08:01:02	5.2	12 km (7 mi)	20 km southwest of Cheviot	
20 September 2017	14:42:10	5.1	15 km (9 mi)	30 km northeast of Seddon	
22 October 2017	17:10:59	5.6	8 km (5 mi)	10 km west of Kaikōura	

== Subsequent analysis ==
The Kaikōura earthquake was a land earthquake of unexpected complexity, suggesting a multi phase event. Analysis of data showing the aftershock sequence's orientation and an immediate size of displacement relative to length of surface rupture inconsistent with standard models has led to evolution of a new model for some surface megathrust earthquakes.

It is postulated that an initial dominantly strike-slip event on the Humps Fault within the Pacific plate's continental crust (not associated with the Pacific plate subduction margin) ruptured in a classic fashion for about 40 km (25 mi) of this fault, equivalent to about a M_{w} 7.0 event. This area of the South Island does not have the Pacific plate subducting at the Hikurangi Margin, which commences at Kaikōura to the north east of the Humps Fault. Rupture of the Humps Fault, as occurred, is not predicted by any classic modelling to propagate to allow rupture in the faults of the Marlborough Fault System as was observed to happen. About 45 seconds later, in a second phase, a subsurface megathrust earthquake was initiated in the adjacent area. It was this megathrust earthquake that allowed the rupture of multiple surface faults with atypically high displacements. Such coupling is the new model. Most megathrust earthquakes occur offshore so there had been no direct evidence before now of such immediate displacements, but it has been postulated that both the 1960 Valdivia earthquake and the 1855 Wairarapa earthquake could have been associated with coupling of a shallow subduction megathrust earthquake with surface faults in the overlaying plate, as happened in this second phase. The third phase involved classic propagation via northeast shallow crustal strike-slip faulting in the north east Kekerengu and Needles faults.

A peak ground acceleration of 3.23 g was measured in Waiau, which was considered the second highest peak ground acceleration ever in the world. In 2019 it was determined that the measurement at this site was erroneous due to the concrete slab the seismometer was sitting on bouncing, and would have instead been about 1.2 g.

== Gallery ==
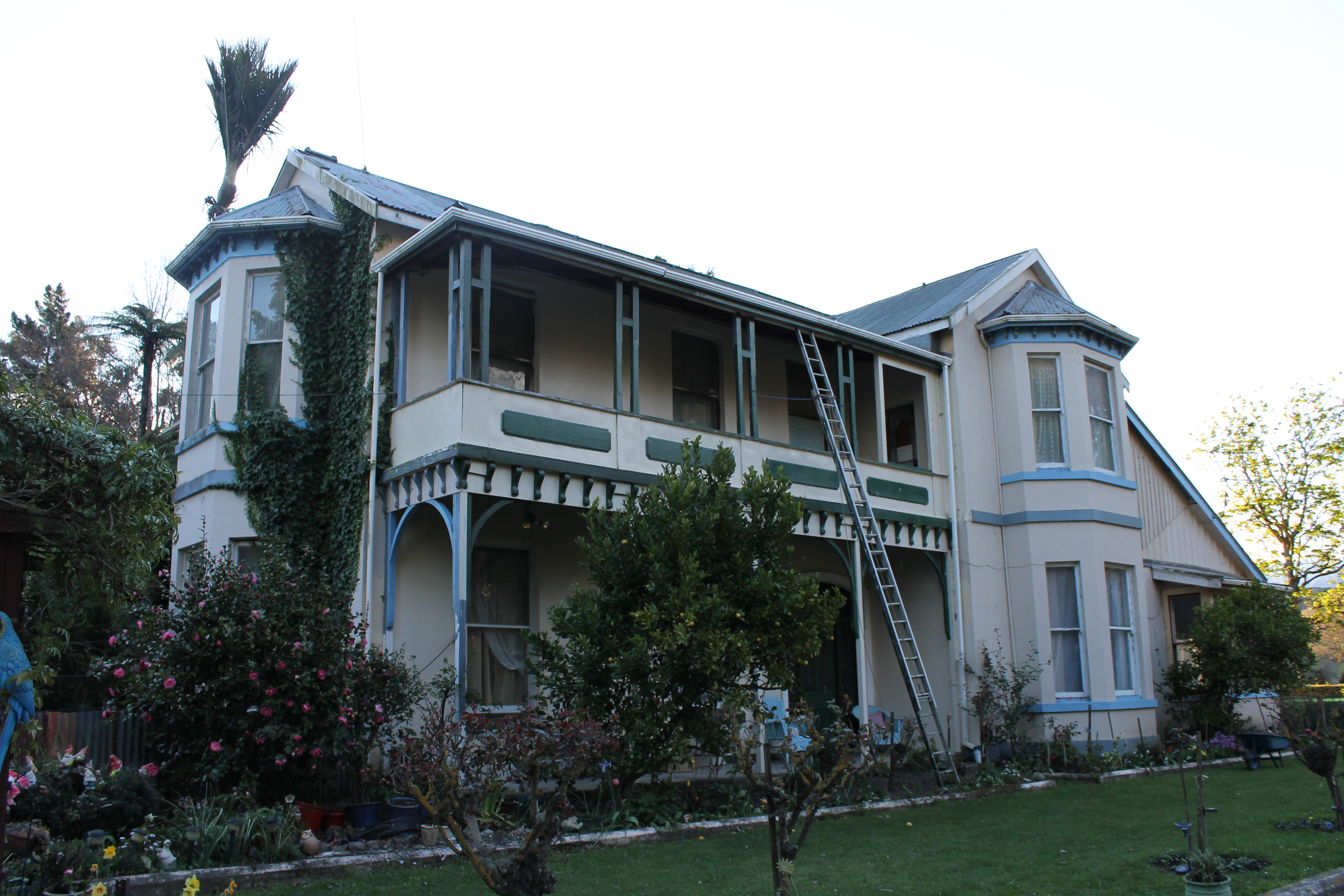
The Elms homestead, pictured here in 2012, collapsed during the earthquake, killing one person

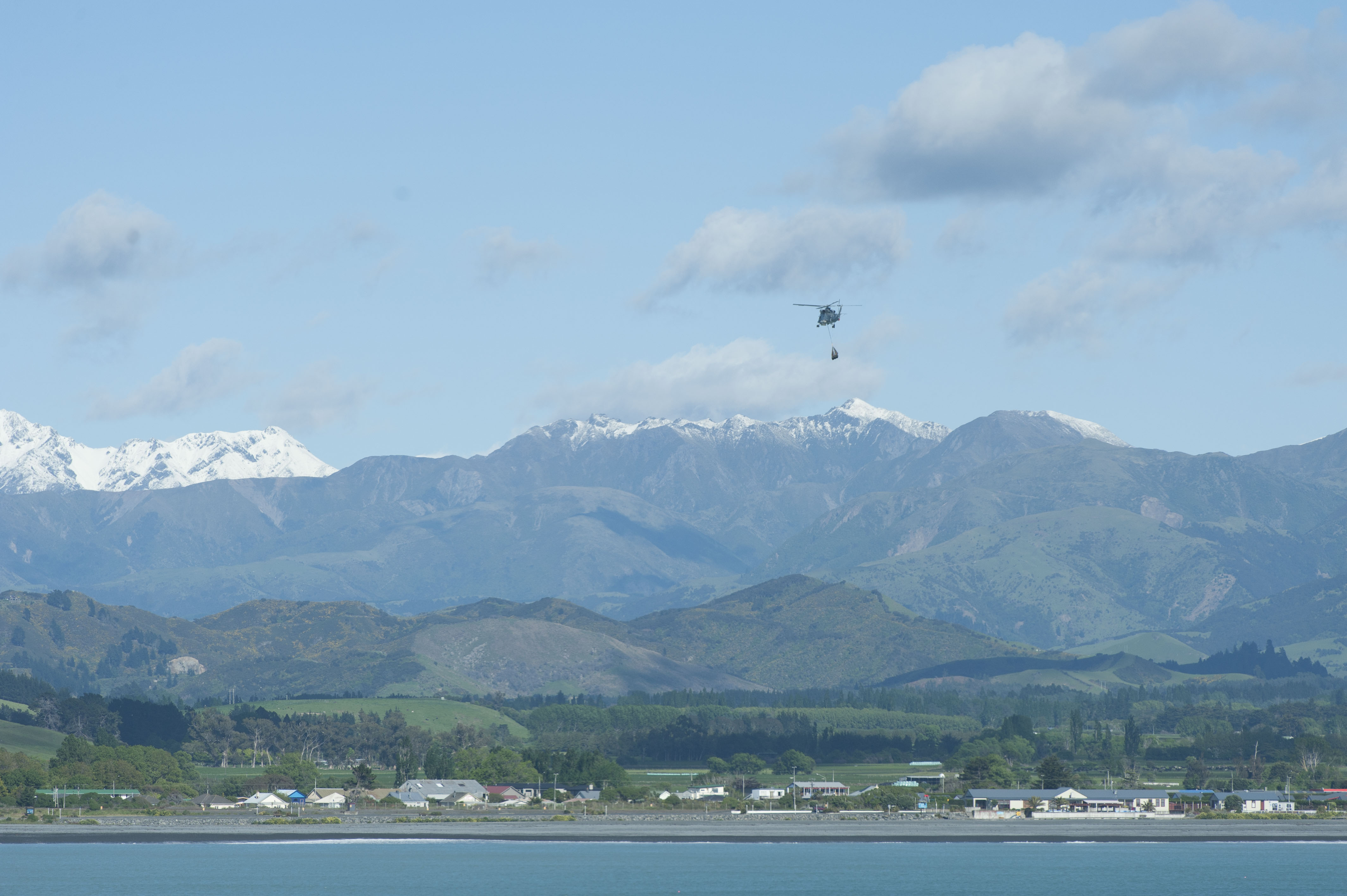
Morning supply run from USS Sampson helicopter

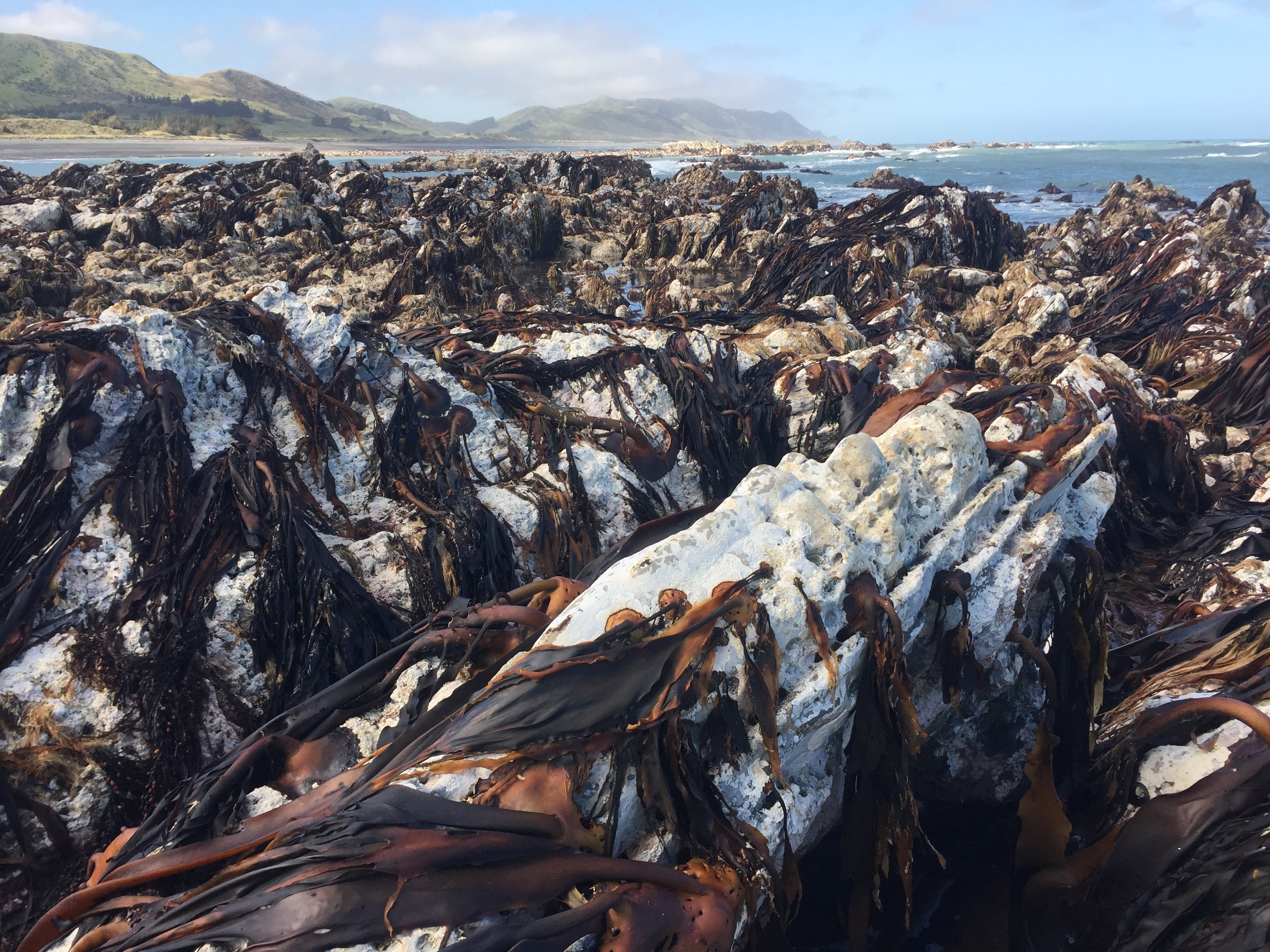
Earthquake uplift at coastal sites resulted in large-scale die offs of intertidal organisms such as Durvillaea kelp

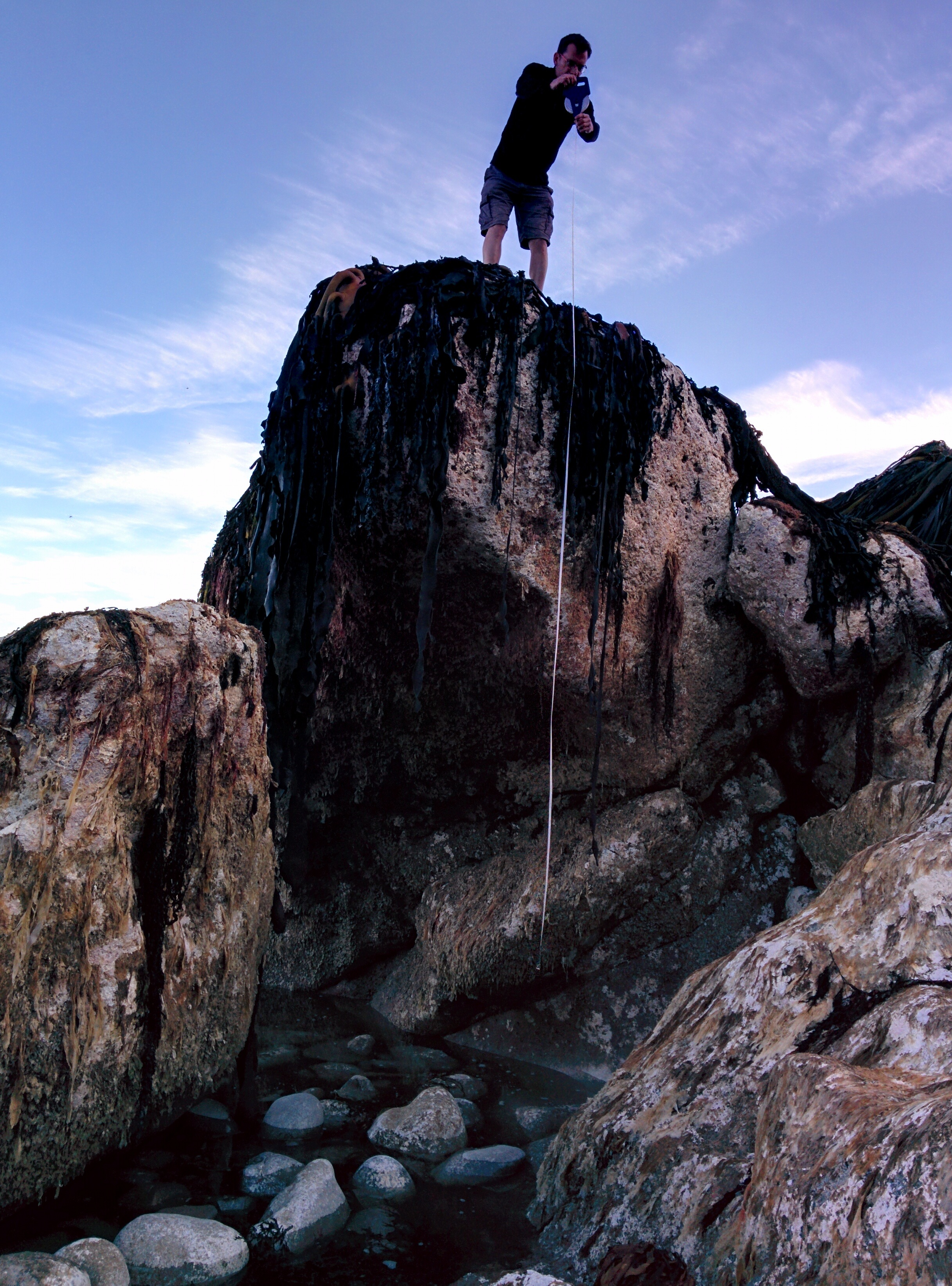
Uplift measured in the intertidal zone at Kaikōura

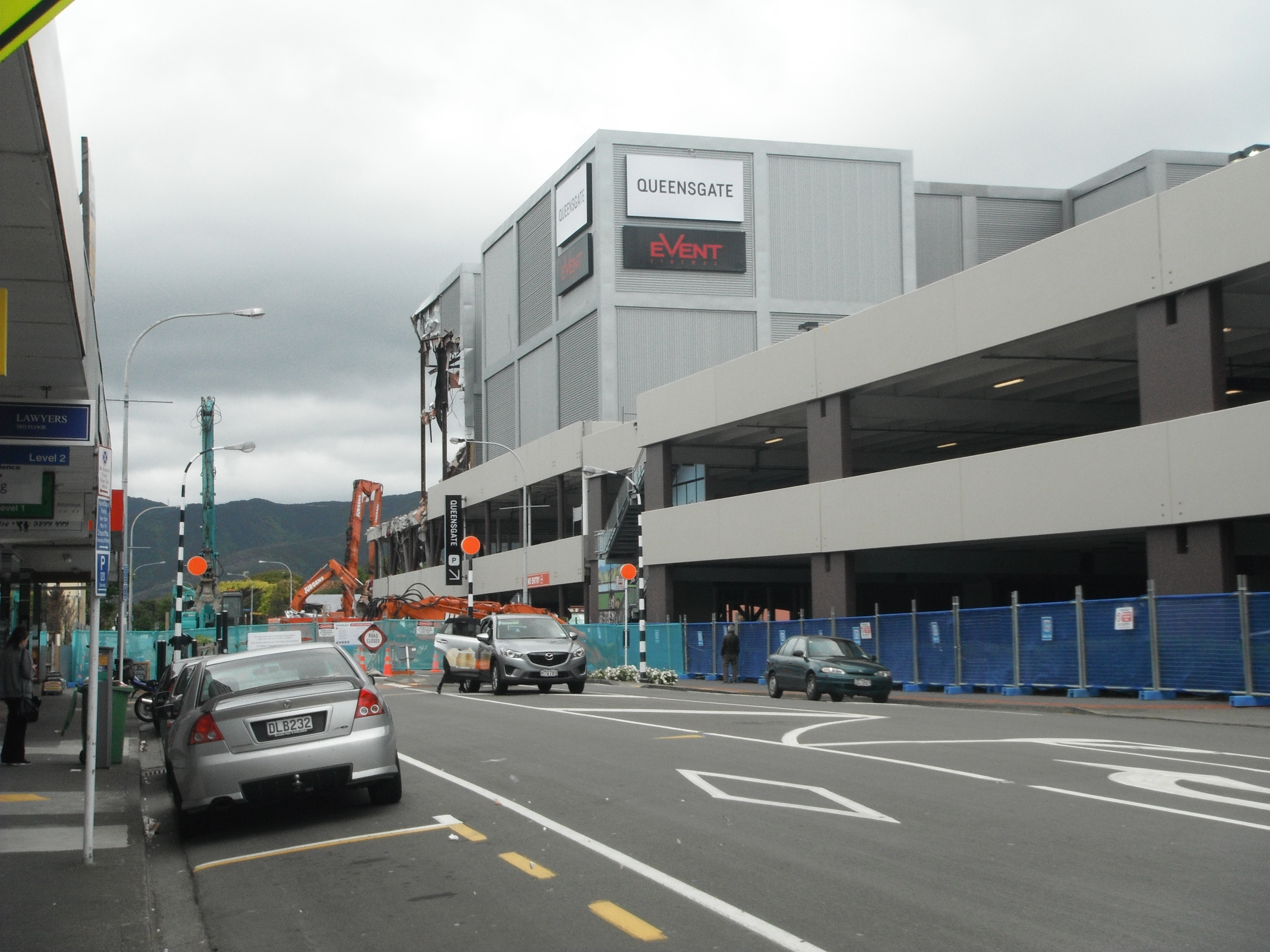
Demolition of the damaged cinema and parking building at Queensgate Shopping Centre, Lower Hutt

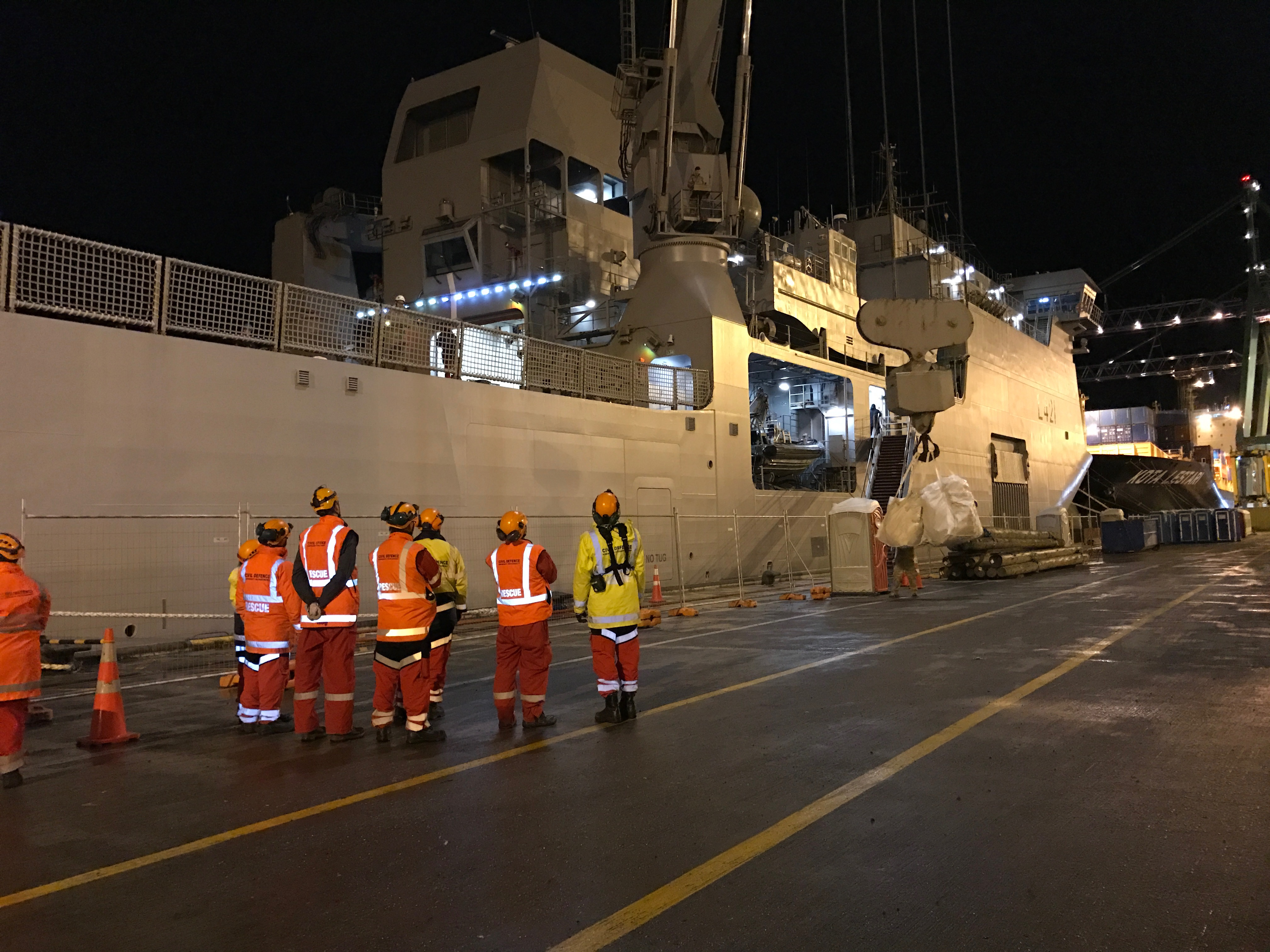
Baggage of evacuees being unloaded off HMNZS Canterbury

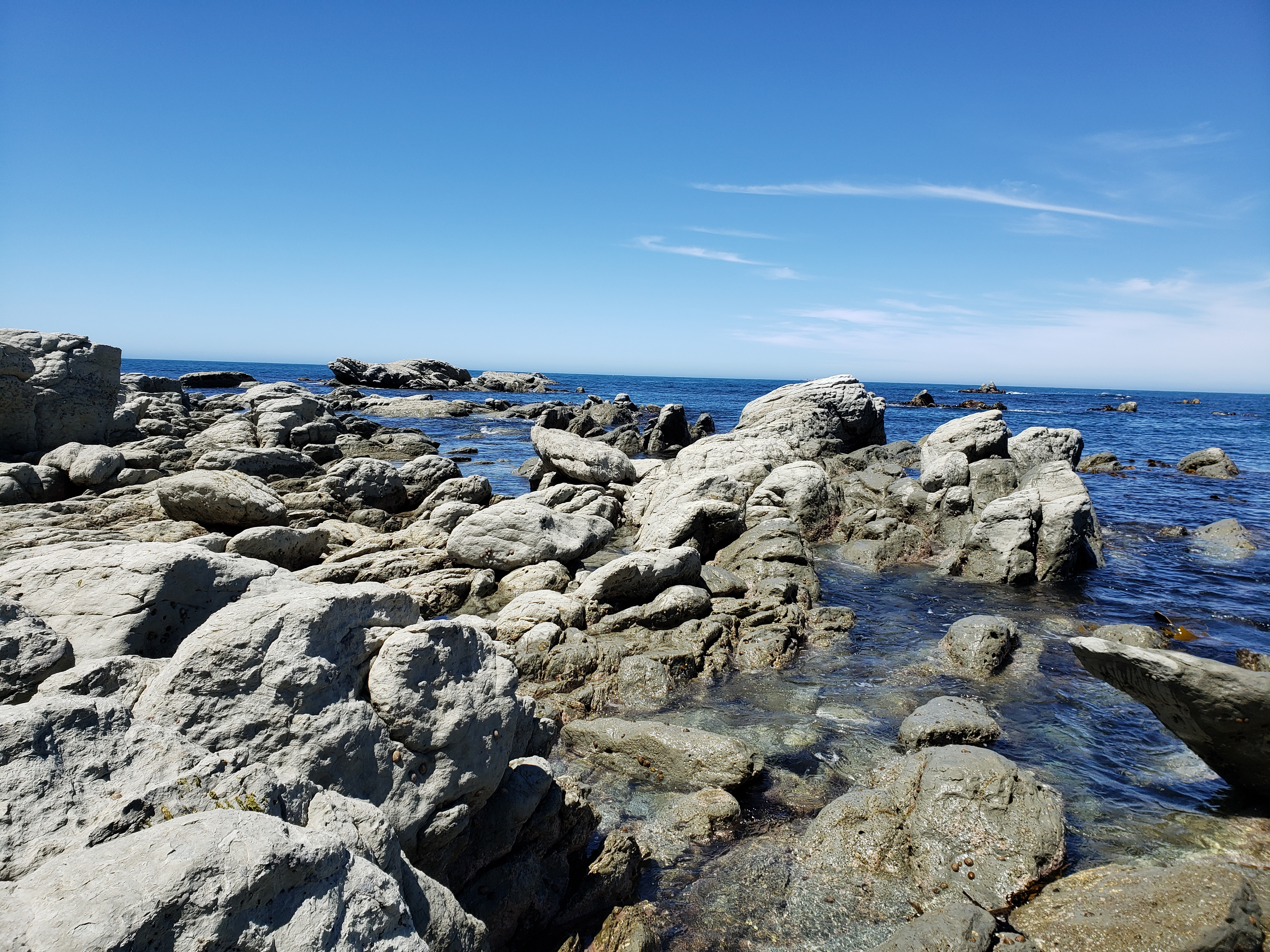
Uplifted shoreline on the Kaikōura Peninsula in 2020

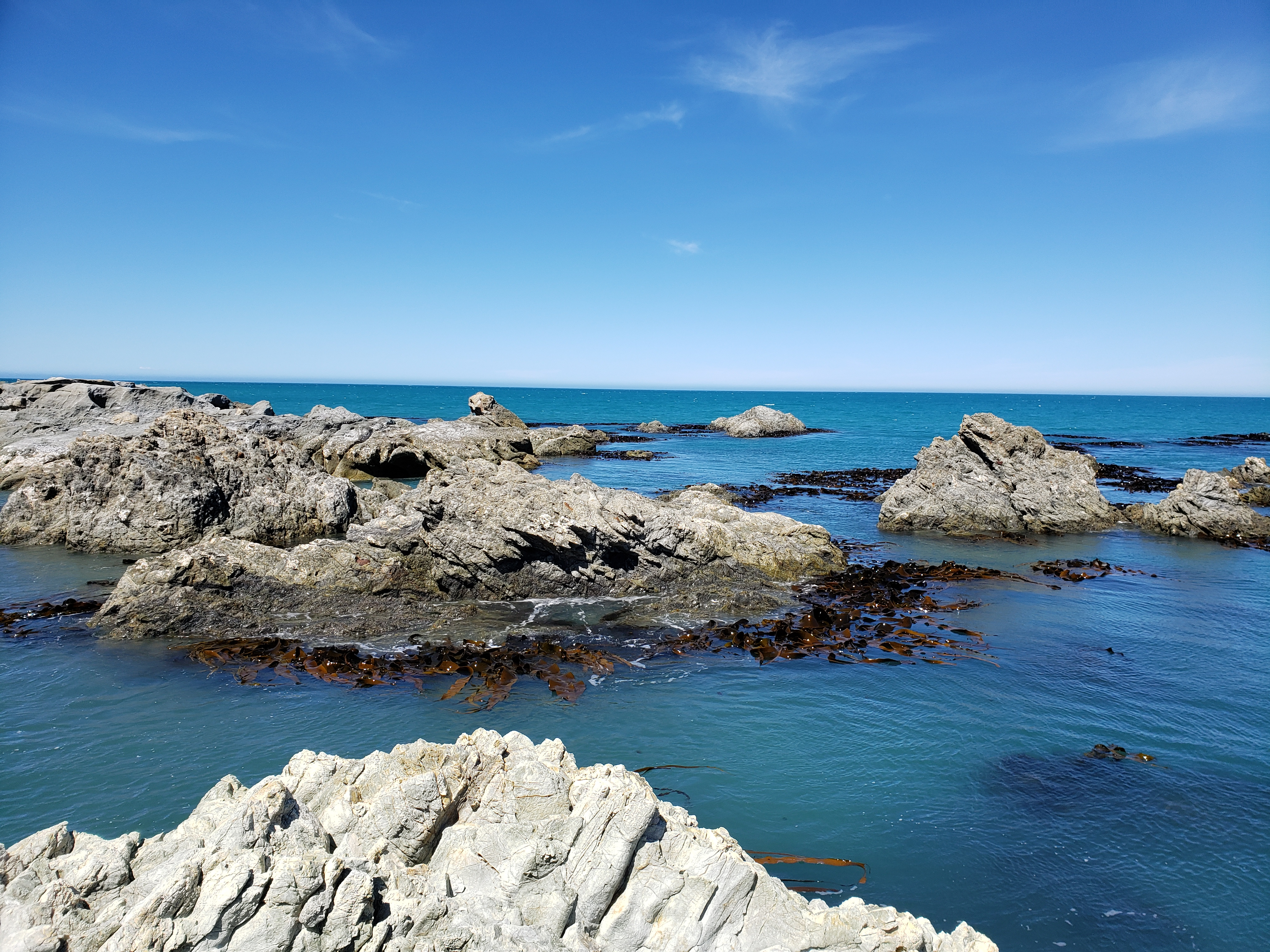
Uplifted shoreline at Ward Beach in 2020

== See also ==
- Kaikōura Canyon § Submarine landslides in the canyon
- List of earthquakes in 2016
- List of earthquakes in New Zealand
- List of tsunamis affecting New Zealand
- Marlborough fault system
