= Mount Woolley (New Zealand) =

Mountain in New Zealand

Coordinates: 42°29′S 172°41′E

- Location within New Zealand

Highest point
- Elevation: 1,743 m (5,719 ft)

Geography
- Location: Canterbury, New Zealand

Mount Woolley is a 1,743-metre-high (5,719 ft) mountain in Canterbury, in the South Island of New Zealand. It is located 12 kilometres west-north-west of the town of Hanmer Springs, close to the western end of the Hanmer Range, a curved ridge with several peaks between 1500 and 1900 metres in height. The highest peak in the range is the 1875-metre Mount Miromiro, located one kilometre to the west of Mount Woolley.

Mount Woolley forms part of the divide between the watersheds of the Grantham and Edwards Rivers, two tributaries of the winding Waiau Uwha River.
