= Wandle River =

Coordinates: 42°36′S 173°06′E

Location
- Country: New Zealand

Physical characteristics
- Source
  - location: Mount Lyford, Amuri Range
- Mouth
  - location: Mason River
- Length: 16 kilometres (10 mi)

The Wandle River is a river of the north Canterbury region of New Zealand's South Island. It flows generally south from the slopes of Mount Lyford to reach the Mason River 10 kilometres (6 mi) northeast of Waiau. The Mount Lyford Alpine Resort lies close to the river's source, Lake Stella.

== See also ==
- List of rivers of New Zealand
