= Hookhamsnyvy Creek =

River in New Zealand

Coordinates: 42.647136°S 173.276150°E

The Hookhamsnyvy Creek is a natural watercourse in the northern Canterbury region of New Zealand's South Island.

The Hookhamsnyvy Creek is north of Parnassus and rises in the Hundalee Hills. It runs roughly south before briefly turning west to join the Leader River.

In 1912, the Main North Line railway was opened from Christchurch to Parnassus, with the ultimate objective of creating a line north to Picton via Blenheim and Kaikōura. The first route north followed the Leader Valley and would have required a diversion of the Hookhamsnyvy Creek. Some initial groundwork was done for this, but the outbreak of World War I in 1914 caused construction to be paused. When it resumed, a new coastal route via Hundalee was chosen, the diversion of the Hookhamsnyvy Creek permanently abandoned, and the line opened in 1945.
