= Little Lottery River =

Coordinates: 42°32′S 173°03′E

Location
- Country: New Zealand

Physical characteristics
- Source
  - location: Amuri Range
- Mouth
  - location: Lottery River
- Length: 8 km (5.0 mi)

The Little Lottery River is a river of the northeast of New Zealand's South Island. It flows southwest through the Amuri Range, flowing into the Lottery River, part of the Waiau River system.

== See also ==
- List of rivers of New Zealand
