= Main North Line, New Zealand =

Railway line in New Zealand between Picton and Christchurch

Main North Line
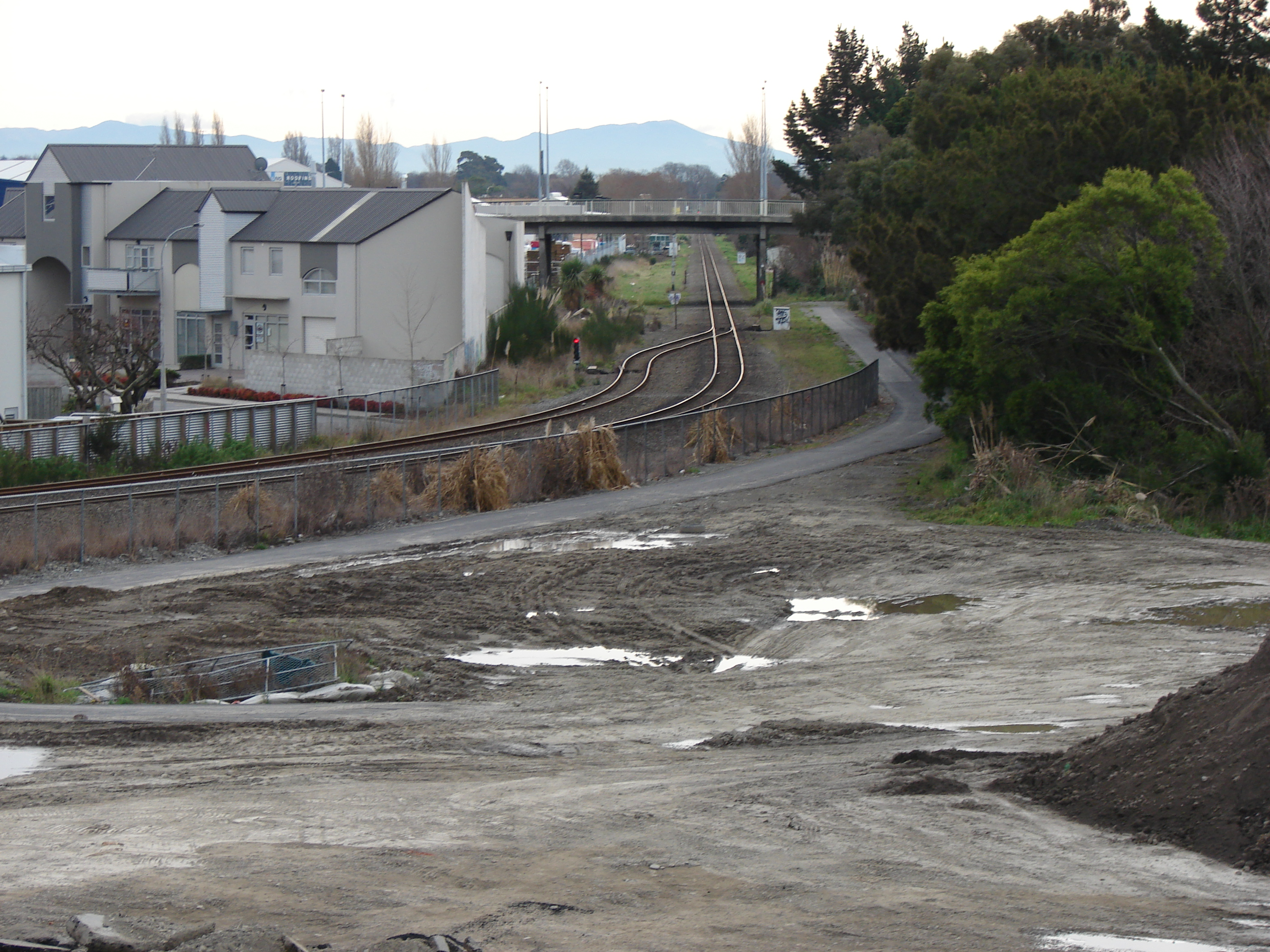
- Start of the Main North Line, heading north under the old Blenheim Road overpass in the distance, and to the left under the new Blenheim Road overpass to Christchurch railway station. The original route of the line was just to the right of the photographer.

Overview
- Status: Operational
- Locale: South Island, New Zealand
- Termini: Addington, Christchurch; Picton, Marlborough
- Stations: 65 (total); 18 (operational)

Service
- Type: Regional rail
- System: KiwiRail
- Operator: KiwiRail

History
- Opened: 29 April 1872

Technical
- Line length: 348.04 km
- Number of tracks: Single
- Character: Main Line
- Track gauge: 3 ft 6 in (1,067 mm)

Map

The Main North Line, sometimes referred to as part of the South Island Main Trunk railway, is a railway line that runs north from Christchurch in New Zealand up the east coast of the South Island through Kaikōura and Blenheim to Picton. It is a major link in New Zealand's national rail network and offers a connection with roll-on roll-off ferries from Picton to Wellington. It was also the longest railway construction project in New Zealand's history, with the first stages built in the 1870s and not completed until 1945.

== Construction ==
The first proposal for a line resembling the present day Main North Line was made in 1861. A proposal for a line linking Christchurch and Blenheim was put before the Marlborough Provincial Council in April 1861. Later that year, the national government passed the Picton Railway Act in October, approving a line from Picton to the Wairau River under the auspices of the Marlborough Provincial Council. The political authorisation did not translate into actual construction and no work on building the line was undertaken in the 1860s. The Canterbury Provincial Railways began to extend their 1,600 mm (5 ft 3 in) broad gauge network north from Christchurch through Kaiapoi (29 April 1872), Southbrook (July 1872, the extension to Rangiora being delayed by lack of chairs), Rangiora (5 November 1872) Balcairn (3 November 1875) and Amberley (9 February 1876), reaching Waipara on 29 September 1880 - by this stage, the Canterbury network had been re-gauged to the national gauge of 1,067 mm (3 ft 6 in) narrow gauge and acquired by the central government.

In the north in Marlborough, a railway from Blenheim to Picton was one of the first railways built under Vogel's "Great Public Works Policy". Authorised by the Railways Act, 1870, to cost £3500 (pounds sterling) per mile.

Nelson also sought a connection to the national network, possibly via an extension of the east coast main line or a branch line from it. The first portion of the Nelson Section railway opened in January 1876, and gradually extended towards the West Coast.

In the 1880s, work ground to a halt as debate raged over what route to construct. An 1880 Royal Commission on the state of New Zealand's railways felt that an east coast main line would be premature, but possibly necessary in the future. Contrarily, regional actors in Canterbury, Marlborough, Nelson, and the West Coast argued passionately in favour of the proposals that best suited their interests. Canterbury slowly progressed its "Great Northern Railway" and pursued an inland route from Waipara, reaching Waikari in 1882, Medbury in 1884, and Culverden in 1886. Also in 1882, the Middle Island Railway Extension Commission ('Middle Island' then being the name for the South Island) was established to study proposals for a line northwards, including the following routes:

- from Culverden to Hanmer Springs and Tophouse, with the line splitting into two branches in Tophouse, one to Nelson and the other down the Wairau River valley to Blenheim.
- from Culverden up the Waiau River to Reefton, New Zealand, establishing a trans-Alpine route to the West Coast, followed by a line up the Buller Gorge to Nelson. (At this stage, no route for the Midland Line connecting the east and west coasts had been chosen; this was one of a number of candidates.)
- from Waipara up the coast to Blenheim via Parnassus and Kaikōura.

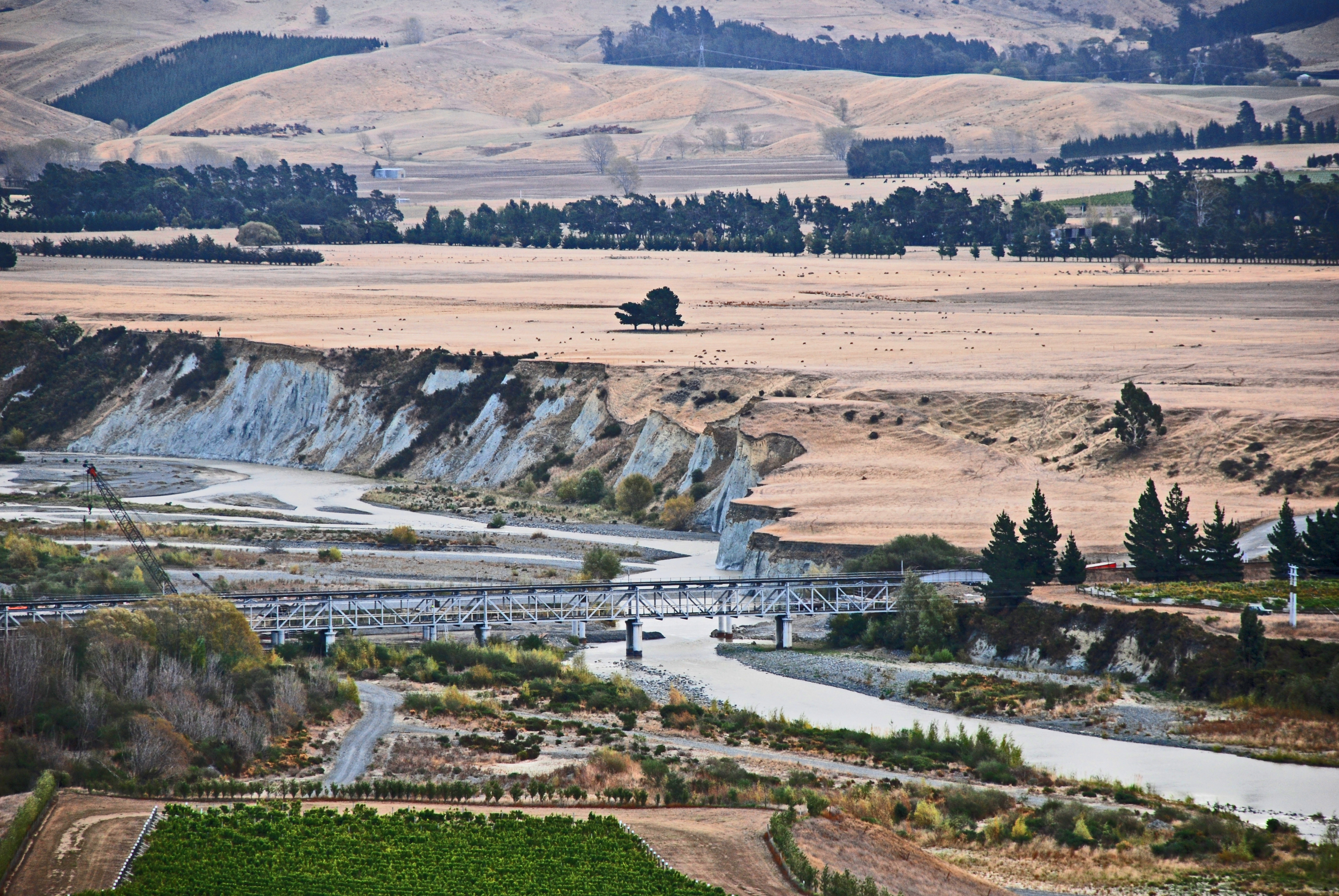
The Awatere River double-decker bridge, located near Seddon. The upper deck carries the railway and the lower deck carried State Highway 1 until October 2007.

Interests in Marlborough favoured the coastal proposal and began work on extending their railway south from Blenheim. Canterbury appeared indecisive on a route north; once Culverden was reached in 1886, it was treated as the terminus of the east coast main line, then after roughly 15 years of inactivity, work began on a coastal "branch" north from Waipara at the start of the 20th century. This reached Scargill in 1902, Ethelton in 1905, Domett in 1907, Cheviot in 1910 (the station was in nearby Mina), and in 1912 the line crossed the Waiau River with a 706-metre-long (2,316 ft) bridge and was opened to Parnassus. Over the next two years, work progressed from Parnassus up the Leader River valley, with roughly three kilometres of track laid, a few more kilometres of formation made, preliminary activity undertaken for a diversion of the Hookhamsnyvy Creek, and work commenced on a bridge across the Leader River. The line was envisaged to then follow a series of inland valleys (such as those of the Conway and Charwell Rivers) to Kaikōura. The outbreak of World War I led to a halt on construction and the track beyond Parnassus was removed. At the Marlborough end, the line was extended southward from Blenheim to reach Seddon in 1902 and Ward in 1911. The line reached Wharanui, 13 km (8.1 mi) south of Ward, before the onset of World War I saw construction halted.

Not all work was postponed by the war. A campaign to extend the line from Culverden to Waiau was successful and construction continued through the war, with the line opened to Waiau on 15 December 1919. This boosted the hopes of those seeking an inland route, and more work was undertaken, with 3 km of formation built for a line from Waiau to Kaikōura, but ultimately nothing came of this proposal and the terminus remained in Waiau. The 1920s saw little progress made on the Main North Line as various interest groups, governments, and expert reports contested to achieve their respective desired outcomes. At this stage, both the Leader Valley and Tophouse routes were still possibilities, but it was around this time that proposals of a route out of Parnassus in a more easterly direction than the Leader Valley began to be formulated. This became the present-day route.

In the late 1920s, construction finally recommenced on the coastal line south of Wharanui, but this soon stopped again when the Great Depression's effects began to be severely felt. Public pressure for a resumption of work was strong, and as the economy was starting to improve in 1936 the government issued orders for completion in four years. In 1939, the line beyond Parnassus was opened to Hundalee, but the outbreak of World War II created more delays and the goal of completion in four years was not achieved. Construction continued through the war, and not long after the resumption of peace the northern and southern railheads met in Kaikōura. The Main North Line from Christchurch to Picton was completed and officially opened on 15 December 1945.

== Stations ==
The Public Works Department named new stations, and sometimes aroused local opposition. In 1914 a station south of the River Ure was to be named "Mills" after the local MP Charles Mills. But a petition from 40 locals asked that a Māori or flora name be used, so it was called "Wharanu". And when a local committee could not agree on another name, they agreed to use the first words uttered by a late-arriving member. When the chairman told him of their decision on his arrival, his immediate reply was "No! Not I". So "No Noti" later "Nonoti" was adopted as the official name; as shown on the small station in the thirties, and in the Gazetteer and maps.

== Operation ==
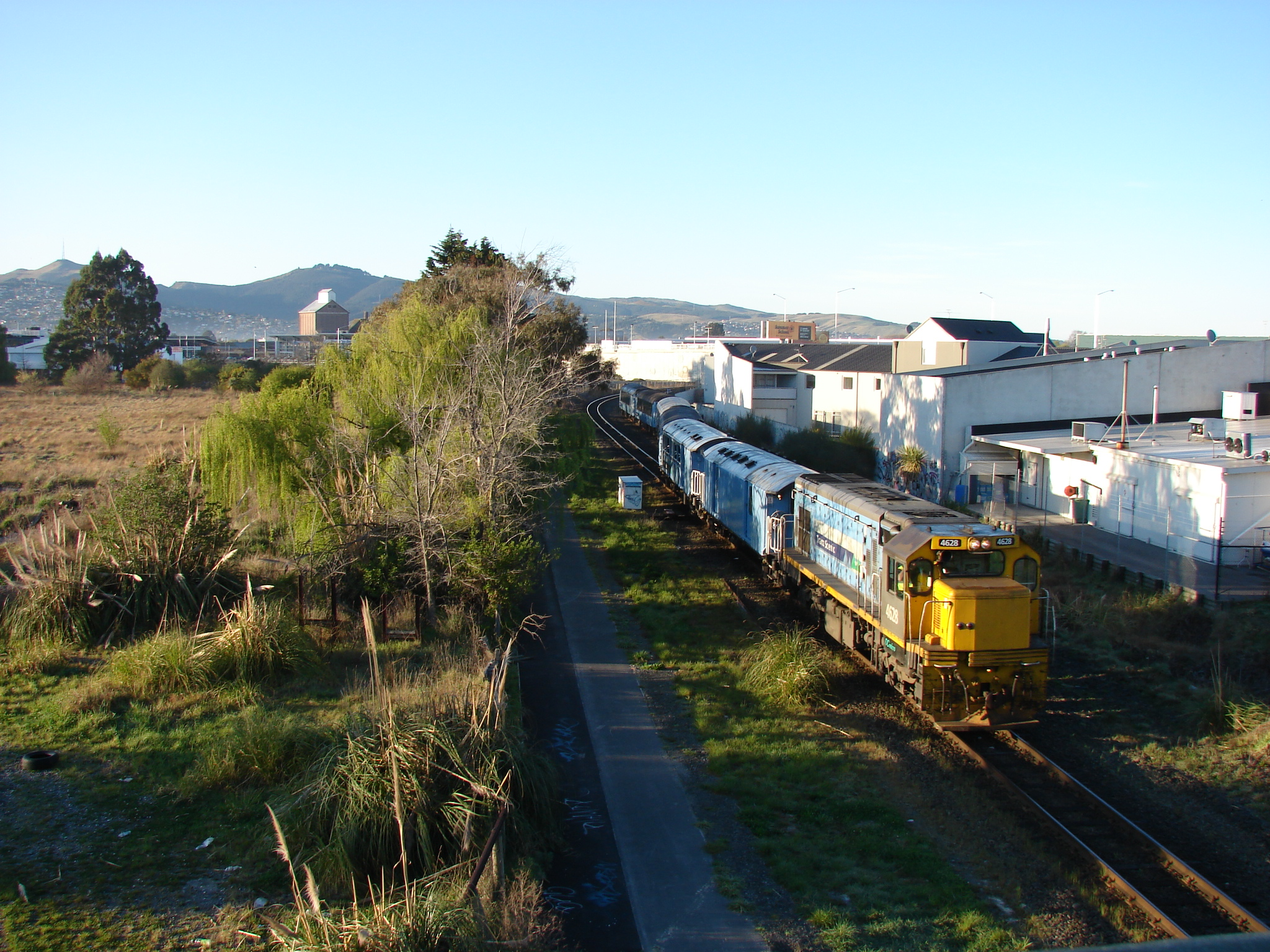
A Picton-bound TranzCoastal service departing Christchurch station

For a number of decades before the connection of the northern and southern ends, the Canterbury section was operated with its terminus in Culverden, even when the coastal route reached Parnassus. The most important passenger train was the Culverden Express, with carriages for Parnassus detached at Waipara. The express was supplemented by slower mixed trains. When the Waiau Branch reached Waiau in 1919 one goods train per day between Christchurch and Culverden was added to the schedule and the passenger train operated twice daily; these services continued to Waiau thrice weekly. The section of the Main North Line between Christchurch and Rangiora also saw commuter services and trains from the Oxford Branch and Eyreton Branch.

In the mid-1920s, Parnassus became the primary terminus and the carriages detached in Waipara were conveyed to Culverden. During this period the train was used for trials of the 'Midland Red' paint scheme that came to be used nationwide for passenger carriages until the 1990s.

In 1930, a Royal Commission on New Zealand's railways suggested all passenger services on the southern and northern sections be replaced by mixed trains, but this was not positively received by the public. On 29 January 1939, the passenger services on the Waiau line were cancelled.

When the line was completed, the Picton Express left Christchurch at 8.25am and reached at Picton at 4.35pm, over 2 hours faster than the previous links. During holidays it ran 6 days a week, but otherwise the coal-saving timetable was on Mondays, Wednesdays and Fridays. From 13 February 1956, the RM class 88 seater railcars were introduced to New Zealand and they were placed on a 6 days a week service between Christchurch and Picton, cutting times to 7 hours, with 34 stops, and then, in 1959, 6 hours 40 mins, with 23 stops. The railcars were converted for locomotive haulage from 5 December 1977 and the journey reduced to 6 hours by 1982.

The scenic value of the route, especially through the Kaikōura area, led to the creation of the tourist-focused Coastal Pacific, an express passenger train that ran between Christchurch and Picton in 5 hours and 20 minutes. It began on 25 September 1988 and, in May 2000, renamed as the TranzCoastal. In the summer of 1994/1995 this service was supplemented by the Lynx Express which ran to a faster timetable and was designed to connect with the Lynx fast ferry service in Picton. It was unsuccessful and did not operate in subsequent summers, partly due to delays from the risk of track buckling.

The TranzCoastal was suspended as a result of the major Christchurch earthquake in February 2011 and did not resume until August that year, returning to the original Coastal Pacific name. The line was closed by major slips as a result of the 2016 Kaikōura earthquake with a freight train being left stranded north of Kaikōura. The line between Picton and Spring Creek yard remained open to allow rail wagon freight from the Interislander ferries to be transshipped to road and vice versa. The section of line from Spring Creek south to Lake Grassmere reopened on 16 January 2017. Works to restore the line were completed on 8 August 2017, and limited freight services were restored on 15 September 2017.

In November 2018, Prime Minister Jacinda Ardern announced that KiwiRail is to get $40 million from the Provincial Growth Fund, to provide a year-round service by the Coastal Pacific and to upgrade the Kaikōura, Blenheim and Picton stations.

On 25 May 2021, construction finished on bypassing the No. 21 (Tar Barrel) Tunnel with a new cutting and an overpass under State Highway 1.

=== Freight ===
Freight increased from 15 trains a week southbound in 1952, to 29 in 1988 and 36 in 2001. It totalled about a million tonnes a year before the 2016 earthquake. A 1994 attempt to regain Auckland-Christchurch freight, with a 24-hour journey, lasted only a couple of years and by 2012 rail's share of that traffic was 28%, road's 57% and ship's 15%.

From 1946 to 1983, some rail freight was airlifted between Woodbourne and Papaparaumu, from 1951 by Straits Air Freight Express. It declined after the service, now run as the Interislander, started in 1962.

=== Motive power ===
A, J and J^{A} class steam locomotives were used on parts of the line until it was completed in 1945, when A^{B} class locomotives took over most work. Diesels took over between 1962 and 1968, initially D^{G} class, then from 1968 D^{J} class, followed by the DF class from 1979 and then DX class locomotives from 1988, relocated to the South Island due to the electrification of the North Island Main Trunk.

== Branch lines ==
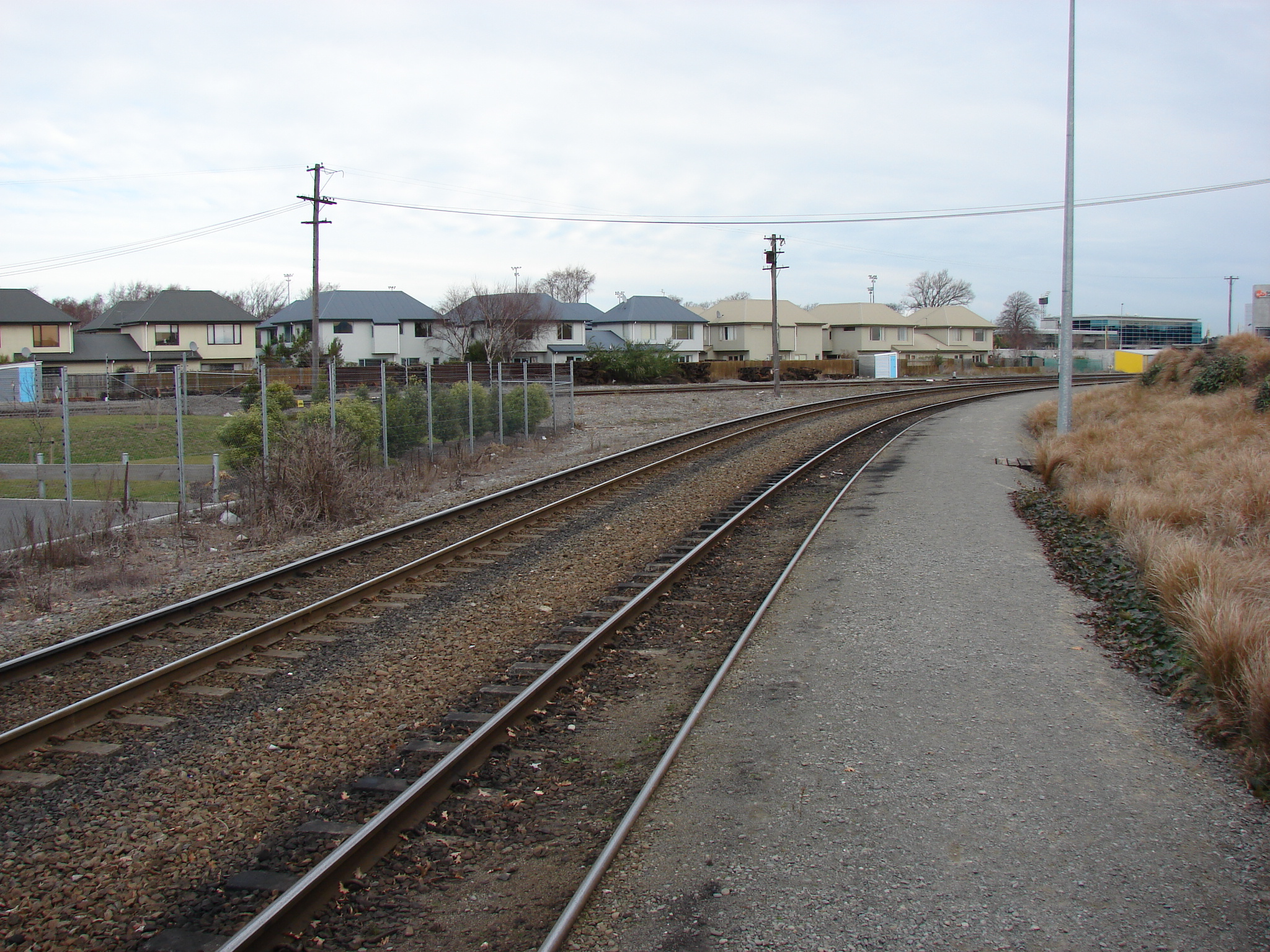
Addington Junction, the point at which the Main North Line meets the Main South Line

The Main North Line parts from the Main South Line in Christchurch. Unlike the Main South Line, few branch lines diverged from the Main North Line. The three that did were:

- Eyreton Branch (junction at Eyreton Junction, closed in 1954)
- Oxford Branch (junction at Rangiora, closed in 1959)
- Waiau Branch (junction at Waipara, closed in 1978)

In 1960, work commenced on a line to link Nelson and Blenheim (see Nelson railway proposals), but a change of government led to a change in policy and this project was halted. Presently, no lines branch from the Main North Line, though the first 13 km of the Waiau Branch has been restored as the Weka Pass Railway and it retains a connection to the Main North Line in Waipara.
