= Inland Kaikōura Road =

Road in New Zealand

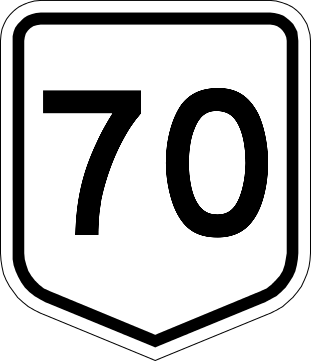

Route information
- Maintained by Kaikōura District Council; Hurunui District Council
- Length: 96.7 km (60.1 mi)
- Tourist routes: Alpine Pacific Triangle

Major junctions
- South end: SH 7 north of Culverden
- North end: SH 1 south of Kaikōura

Location
- Country: New Zealand
- Primary destinations: Mt Lyford, Waiau, Rotherham

Highway system
- New Zealand state highways; Motorways and expressways; List
← SH 69	→ SH 71

The Inland Kaikōura Road, formally designated Route 70, is a local highway in the South Island of New Zealand that runs from just south of Kaikōura to just north of Culverden via Waiau, Rotherham and Mount Lyford Village. It follows the same route as the former State Highway 70. White shields marked with "70" are used to signify this highway. It forms part of the Alpine Pacific Triangle touring route, and also serves as an alternative inland route for State Highway 1 in the event of a closure. Following the 14 November 2016 Kaikōura earthquake, all roads into Kaikōura were closed including the Inland Kaikōura Road. After extensive regrading and clearance, the Inland Road was the first road connection to Kaikōura to reopen and served as a lifeline for the community in the wake of the earthquake.

Because of its scenic qualities it is now noted as one of the must-drive roads in New Zealand. The road is two lanes for its majority, however in parts it is narrow and winds through steep hill country with several river valleys, including one-lane bridges.

== History ==
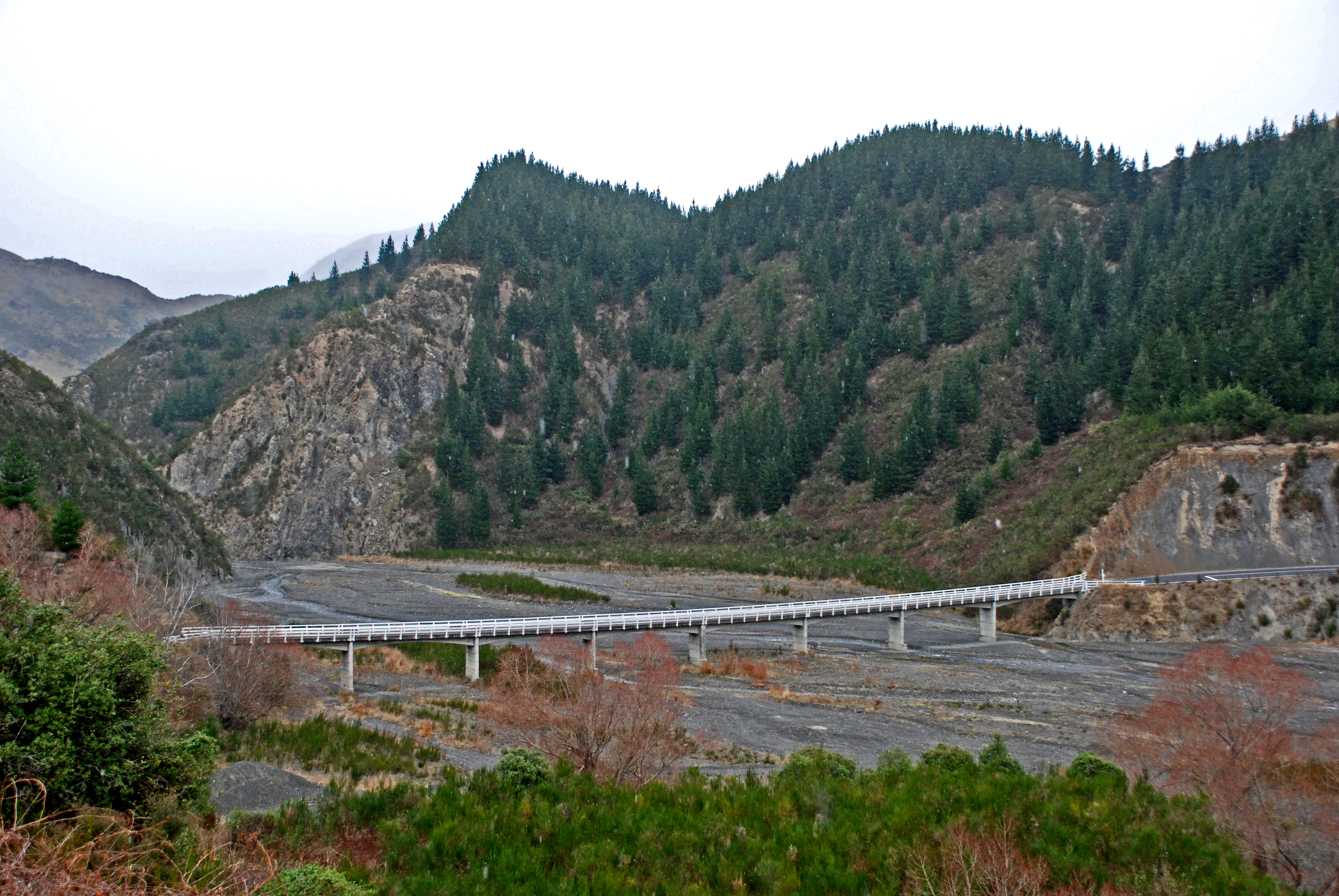
Conway River Bridge

State Highway 70 lost its state highway status due to a lack of substantial use, and as part of a wider re-alignment of the State Highway system to focus on routes of national significance, as opposed to regional significance. In 1991 the section from Waiau to Kaikōura was revoked. Before revocation approximately 30 kilometres (19 mi) of highway was unsealed; this was later sealed by the two district councils which maintained it. The remainder of SH 70 was revoked in 2004.

The road was closed following the 2016 Kaikōura earthquake and was for a few days open to the military only; the first army convoy reached Kaikōura on Friday, 18 November 2016, and this remained the only land route into Kaikōura as SH1 was completely cut off by the earthquake. Some time later, registered convoys were allowed. Unrestricted access was restored on 19 December 2016, giving the public road access to Kaikōura again.

== Route ==
The route primarily runs inland at the foot of the Kaikōura Ranges after turning from SH 1 immediately south of the Kowhai River. It runs parallel with the river before it turns south west running almost parallel to SH 1 in an adjacent valley. After crossing the Conway River, the road becomes known as the "Inland Road" as opposed to the "Inland Kaikōura Road". It continues south, eventually passing the intersection with Mt Lyford Forest Drive (for access to Mount Lyford Village and Ski Area), before becoming Leslie Street within the town of Waiau. The route makes a turn westward in Waiau onto Rotherham Road North, which it remains on until the town of Rotherham, where it transitions into George Street and eventually Rotherham Road South. The route concludes at the junction of Rotherham Road South and Mouse Point Road (State Highway 7) at "Red Post".

== Major intersections ==
Territorial authority	Location	km	mi	Destinations	Notes
Kaikoura District	Peketā	0	0.0	SH 1 north (Alpine Pacific Touring Route) - Cheviot, Christchurch; SH 1 south (Alpine Pacific Touring Route) - Kaikōura, Picton	Inland Kaikōura Road Begins
Kaikoura District	Peketā	0	0.0	Elms Road - Kowhai Downs	
Kaikoura District	Inland Road	4	2.5	Lake Hills Road; Kowhai Ford Road	
Kaikoura District	Inland Road	11	6.8	Dairy Farm Road	
Kaikoura District	Inland Road	14	8.7	Blunts Road	
Kaikoura District	Inland Road	20	12	Scotts Road	
Hurunui District	Stag and Spey	30	19	Stag and Spey Road	
Hurunui District	Stag and Spey	39	24	Cloudy Range Road	
Hurunui District	Lyford	52	32	Terako Road	
Hurunui District	Lyford	55	34	Mount Lyford Forest Drive - Mount Lyford Village, Mount Lyford	
Hurunui District	Lyford	57	35	Snowdon Road	
Hurunui District	Waiau	67	42	The Gates Road	
Hurunui District	Waiau	71	44	Chaffeys Road	
Hurunui District	Waiau	72	45	Sherwood Road	
Hurunui District	Waiau	74	46	Lower Mason Road	
Hurunui District	Waiau	76	47	River Road - Tuke-Ngahere Bush Walk	
Hurunui District	Waiau	77	48	Lyndon Street - Cheviot, Kaikōura	Alternative Route to the Inland Road, re-connects to SH1, Leader Road.
Hurunui District	Waiau	79	49	Iverachs Road	
Hurunui District	Rotherham	85	53	Green Road	
Hurunui District	Rotherham	90	56	Leachs Road	
Hurunui District	Rotherham	91	57	SH 7 (Flintoff Mouse Point Road) - Hanmer Springs, West Coast via Lewis Pass; Beavers Road	
Hurunui District	Amuri Plain	97	60	SH 7 north (Mouse Point Road) - Hanmer Springs, West Coast via Lewis Pass; SH 7 south (Mouse Point Road) - Culverden, Christchurch	Inland Kaikōura Road Ends
1.000 mi = 1.609 km; 1.000 km = 0.621 mi

== See also ==
- List of New Zealand state highways
