= Hundalee =

Coordinates: 42°35′S 173°25′E

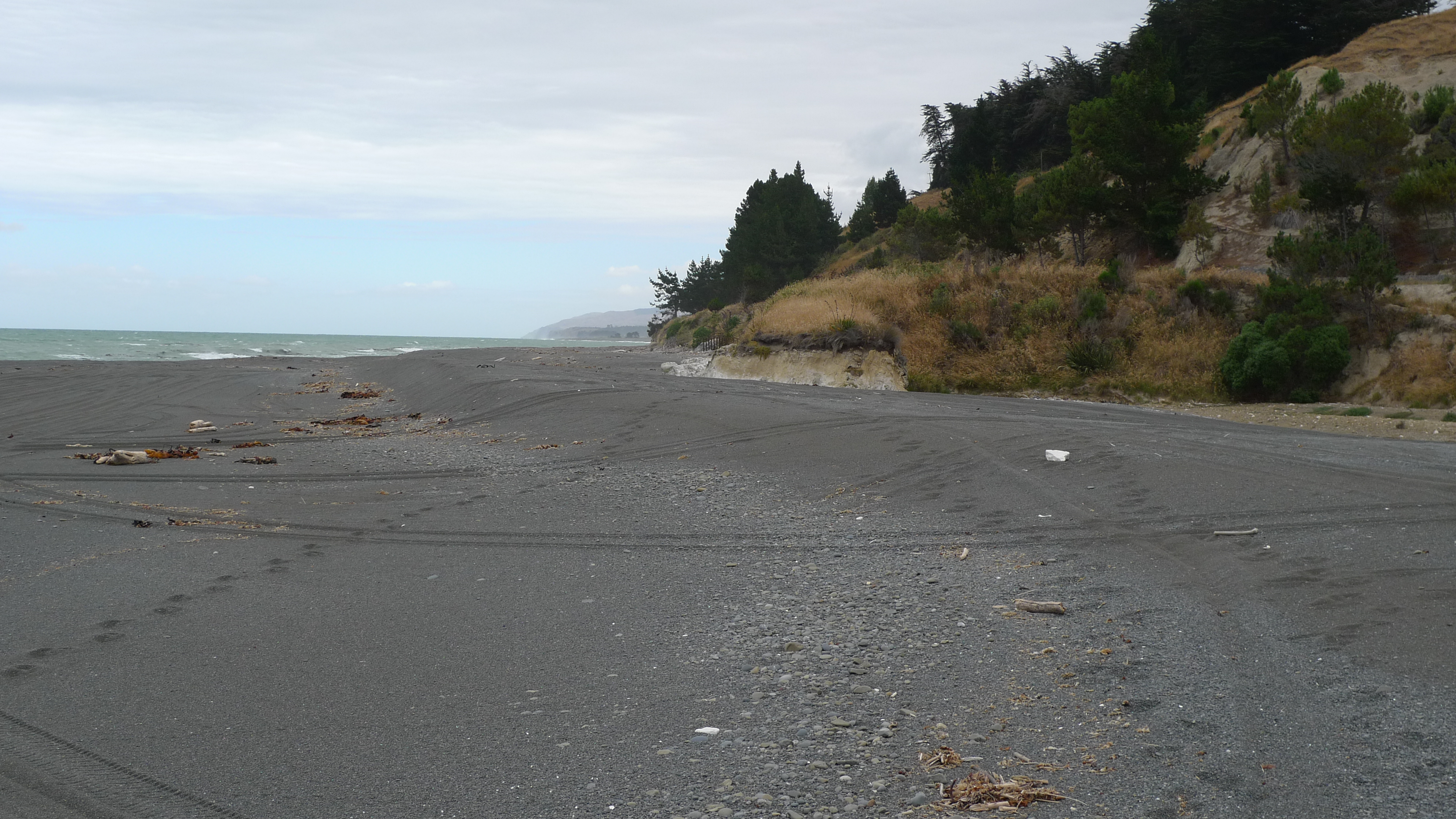
Hundalee 7384, New Zealand

Hundalee is a rural locality in the Hurunui District of the Canterbury region of New Zealand's South Island. It straddles the Conway River, the traditional boundary between Canterbury and Marlborough and is in the Hundalee Hills.

Although once a railway terminus, Hundalee today does not have a defined township as such; the place name refers to the rural properties in the area. One of these properties became the home of World War II hero Charles Upham after he returned from combat.

The railway line was opened to Hundalee from Parnassus in 1939 as work on the Main North Line from Christchurch crept north to meet a line being built southwards from Wharanui. In 1945, the full line was completed when the two ends met in Kaikōura. The railway still runs through Hundalee, but the TranzCoastal express passenger train does not stop. State Highway 1 also passes through Hundalee.
