= Charwell River =

River on New Zealand's South Island

Coordinates: 42°30′S 173°19′E

Location
- Country: New Zealand

Physical characteristics
- Source
  - location: Kaikōura Ranges
- Mouth
  - location: Conway River

The Charwell River is a river in the northeast of New Zealand's South Island. Its headwaters are in the Seaward Kaikōura Ranges and it feeds into the Conway River, the traditional boundary between Marlborough and Canterbury. Sheep farming has taken place in the Charwell River's valley.

In the 1910s, the New Zealand Railways Department proposed to build a railway line through a series of river valleys, including that of the Charwell River, to link Parnassus and Kaikōura as part of the Main North Line. Work began on this route, with some track laid in the Leader River valley, but World War I brought a halt to construction, and when work resumed, a more easterly, coastal route was chosen instead.
