= Amuri Plain =

Plain in Canterbury, New Zealand

Coordinates: 42°45′S 172°55′E

The Amuri Plain (also known as the Amuri Basin) is the northernmost extension of New Zealand's Canterbury Plains. It lies between the Waiau Uwha and Hurunui Rivers and is centred on the town of Culverden. Other population centres on the plain include Rotherham. The plains cover approximately 60,000 hectares (150,000 acres).

The southernmost part of the plain, close to the Hurunui River, is heavily planted in exotic trees (the Balmoral Forest); further north the land is pastoral, and is largely used for sheep and dairy farming. Farming was greatly assisted by the construction of a major irrigation scheme which began in 1977. This also led to growth in the population of the service town of Culverden.
