= Rogerson River =

Coordinates: 42°31′S 172°47′E

Location
- Country: New Zealand
- Region: north Canterbury

Physical characteristics
- Source
  - location: Hanmer Range
- Mouth
  - location: Chatterton River
- Length: 11 km (6.8 mi)

The Rogerson River is a river of the north Canterbury region of New Zealand's South Island. It flows generally east, reaching the Chatterton River at the town of Hanmer Springs.

== See also ==
- List of rivers of New Zealand
