= Stanley River =

Stanley River may refer to:

- Stanley River (Queensland), Australia
- Stanley River (Canterbury), New Zealand
- Stanley River (Tasman), New Zealand
