= Chatterton River =

Coordinates: 42°35′S 172°47′E

Location
- Country: New Zealand

Physical characteristics
- Source
  - location: Hanmer Range
- Mouth
  - location: Percival River
- Length: 7 km (4.3 mi)

The Chatterton River is a river of north Canterbury, New Zealand. It flows south through Hanmer Forest Park, immediately to the west of the town of Hanmer Springs, before flowing into the Percival River shortly before the latter itself flows into the Waiau River

== See also ==
- List of rivers of New Zealand
