= Stanton River =

Coordinates: 42°40′S 173°07′E

Location
- Country: New Zealand

Physical characteristics
- Mouth
  - location: Waiau Uwha River
- Length: 21 km (13 mi)

The Stanton River is a river of the Canterbury region of New Zealand's South Island. It flows southeast through the Hundalee Hills, turning southwest to reach the Waiau Uwha River 7 kilometres (4 mi) east of Waiau.

== See also ==
- List of rivers of New Zealand
