= Manuka Bay =

Bay northeast of the Hurunui River in the South Island of New Zealand

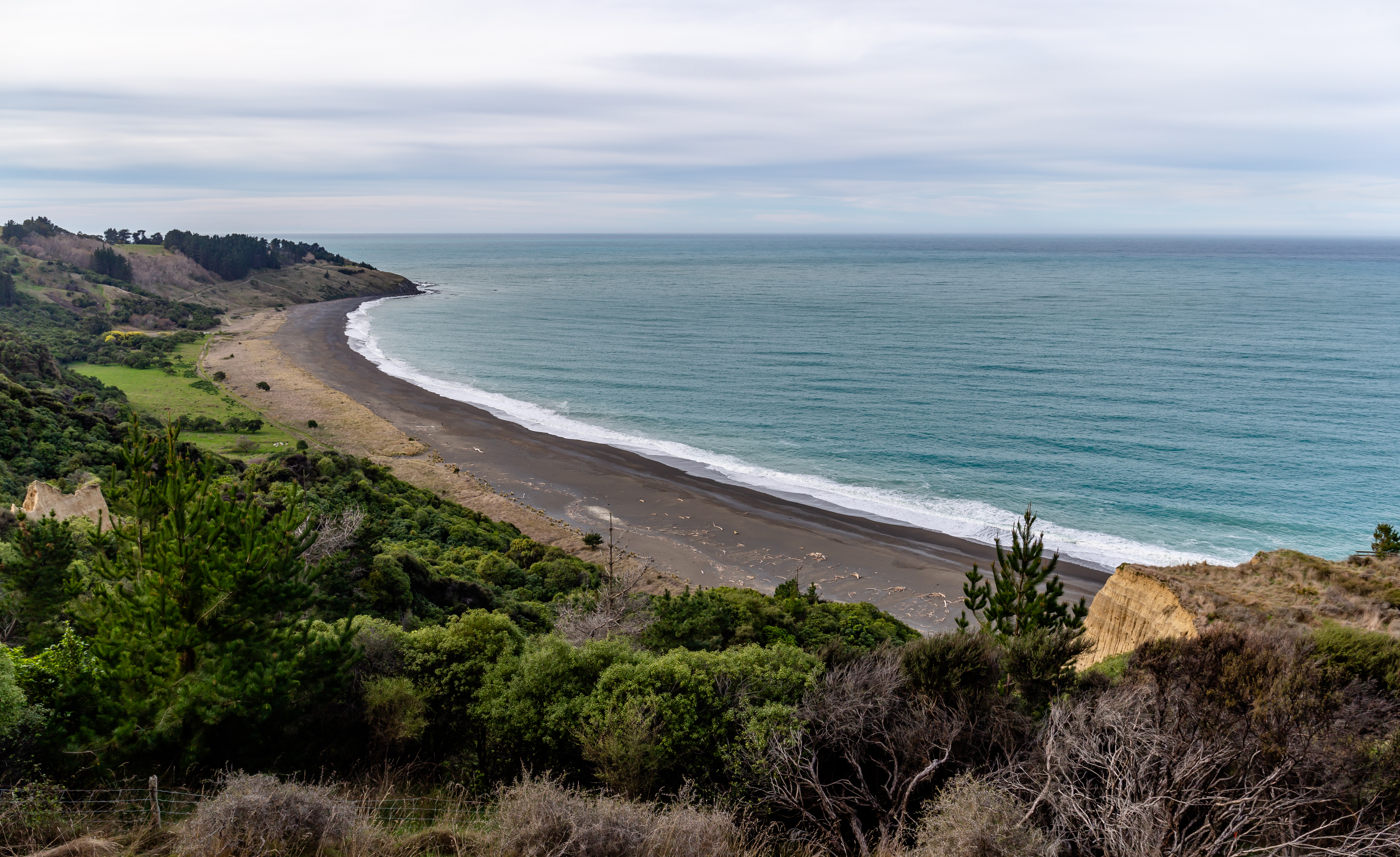
- Manuka Bay, Hurunui District, Canterbury, New Zealand

- Location in New Zealand
- Location: North Canterbury coast, South Island, New Zealand
- Coordinates: 42.8923°S 173.3086°E
- River sources: Hurunui River
- Basin countries: New Zealand
- Settlements: Cheviot

Manuka Bay is located on the North Canterbury coast, northeast of the Hurunui River in the South Island of New Zealand. It is near Napenape and the town of Cheviot.

The area is a popular destination for people who are travelling from coast to coast. It has no toilets and camping is not permitted. It has no stores or gas stations.
