= Mount Lyford =

Mountain in the South Island of New Zealand

Coordinates: 42.446835°S 173.143663°E

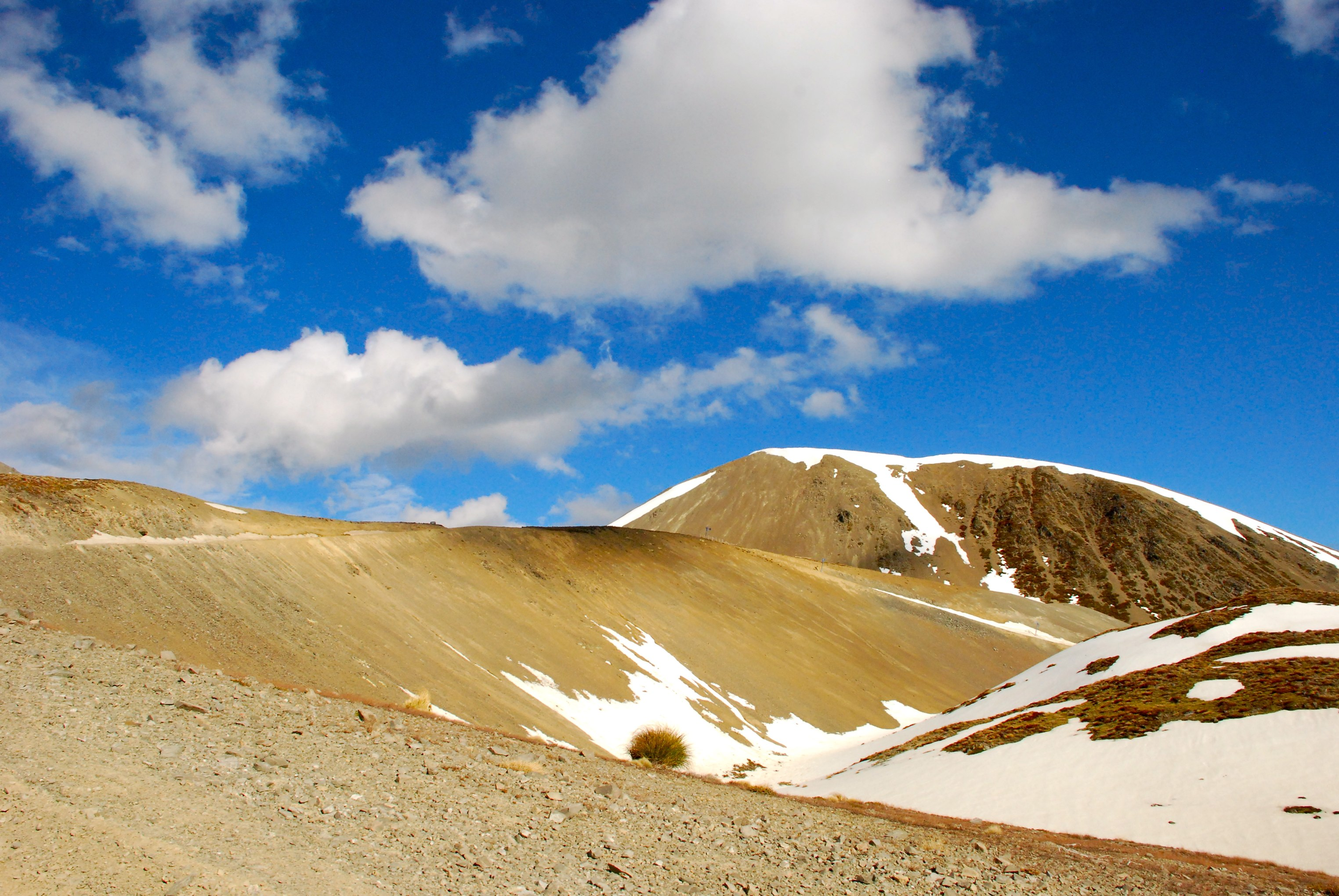
Mount Lyford

Mount Lyford is a peak in the Amuri Range to the west of Kaikōura in the South Island of New Zealand. It is also the name of a ski area to the north of the peak, and an alpine village and ski resort to the south. The ski area is approximately 150 km (93 mi) by road north of Christchurch. The village and ski area are accessed via the Inland Kaikōura Road (SH70) between Culverden and Kaikōura that forms part of the Alpine Pacific Touring Route.

The summit of Mount Lyford is at an elevation of 1,590 m (5,220 ft), but the skifield has been extended to a field on the adjacent Mount Terako at 1,742 m (5,715 ft).

== History ==
Mount Lyford is probably named for Adolphus William Lyford (1857-1912) who for many years was a shepherd at Highfield Station and then at Cloudy Range Station, which are both properties in the vicinity of Mt Lyford.

Mount Lyford was originally in Amuri County until the local government reforms in 1989 when it became part of the Hurunui District.

=== Mount Lyford village ===
In 1986 the village and ski field were developed by Doug and Jenny Simpson, who formerly farmed in the area. The Mount Lyford development constructed and marketed an alpine subdivision of 97 large sections on a 60 ha site. Recreational areas and artificial lakes were also planned and strict building codes were placed on the type of buildings and construction methods use within the subdivision. Originally only log chalets were allowed to be built, with a minimum roof pitch of 45 degrees. In 2020 the rules were relaxed slightly but external wooden appearance is still required to protect the appearance of the village. There are about 50 log houses through the native bush in the alpine village area at an elevation of between 500 m and 750 m above sea level. Some houses are inhabited permanently, whilst others are holiday homes. The village is surrounded by beech, manuka and kanuka trees. Birdlife includes the New Zealand bellbird, fantail, silvereye, golden finch, quail, native robin and other (mostly introduced) species.

=== Mount Lyford ski area and alpine resort ===
In addition to the subdivision the Simpsons developed a commercial ski field catering for families, featuring ice-skating, a day shelter/cafeteria, ski tows and car parking. The first ski field, Lake Stella, operated from 1989 to 1992. Following a run of several years of disappointing snowfall the resort moved higher up the mountain and expanded to a field on the adjacent Mount Terako. The higher elevation makes snowfall more predictable and the ski resort now includes access to Mt Terako (1742 m) and caters for beginner, intermediate and advanced skiers and snowboarders. The runs cover an elevation range of 1249 m to 1740 m. There are several types of lift including T-bar, poma lifts, platters, a rope tow, and an advanced rope tow. Most trails are groomed and there is a snowboard board with half pipe and "fun box".

In early 2001 Mount Lyford Lodge was opened at the base of the ski field access road with accommodation, restaurant and bar facilities. The lodge services the village and passing traffic on the Inland Kaikōura Road.

In 2004, the Mount Lyford area was used as a location for the shooting of a Korean film Antarctic Journal about a Korean expedition to the Antarctic.

=== Forest covenant ===
In 2016, an area of 400 ha (990 acres) of privately owned land on Mount Terako covered in dense mountainous native forest was protected by a covenant under the Queen's Commonwealth Canopy initiative.

== Geology ==
The summit of Mount Lyford is approximately 2.5 km (1.6 mi) north of the Hope Fault; an active dextral (right-lateral) strike-slip fault that forms part of the Marlborough fault system. The northeast-southwest trending Hope Fault separates Late Jurassic to Early Cretaceous greywacke of the Pahau Terrane (part of the Torlesse composite terrane) from younger Miocene to Pliocene cover rocks south of the fault. The greywacke consists of indurated thin-to-medium bedded and commonly graded sandstone and mudstone, and also thick, poorly bedded sandstone. In the general area of the Amuri Range the greywacke has undergone low-grade metamorphism varying from zeolite facies to prehnite-pumpellyite facies.

Structurally the Amuri Range broadly represents an asymmetric fault-propagated fold, parallel to the Hope Fault, with the crest of the fold coinciding with the crest of the range. There are traces of two inactive faults flanking the west and east sides of Mount Lyford, both follow a southwest path towards the Hope Fault and may possibly extend all the way to the Hope Fault. The Amuri Range greywacke is relatively hard, but fractured and jointed. It also forms the higher topography of the Seaward and Inland Kaikōura ranges to the northeast of the Amuri Range.

Mount Lyford Village lies on a gently sloping spur that is part of a deeply dissected alluvial fan surface on the southeast flank of the Amuri Range. The main trace of the Hope Fault runs along the foot of the range and its fault zone is up to 2 km (1.2 mi) wide in the vicinity of the village. Underlying the alluvial fan deposits, and exposed on parts of the spur, are Pliocene-aged marine siltstones that make up part of a truncated and folded Neogene syncline south of the Hope Fault. The alluvial fan is no longer connected to its catchment sources, most likely due to right-lateral displacement along the Hope Fault. When the Mw 7.8 2016 Kaikōura earthquake struck, the village experienced severe shaking causing slope instability and damage to properties. There was, however, little evidence found of any of the Hope Fault’s active traces having ruptured at the surface.

Mount Lyford is notable for fossils preserved in greywacke concretions. Fossils of crabs (Ommatocarcinus arenicola) 10–20 cm wide from the Oligocene can be found in concretions at the Mason River near Mount Lyford, part of a shallow-water fossil fauna that includes fossil abalone. Cannon-ball-sized concretions at the beginning of the Mount Lyford ski field access road contain juvenile shellfish the size of a fingernail.

=== 2016 Kaikōura earthquake ===
The Kaikōura earthquake on 14 November 2016 caused major damage to buildings and roads at Mount Lyford. A resident in the village suffered a fatal head injury in a log house that was damaged in the earthquake. The effects of the earthquake meant that some sections on the north-west side of the Mt Lyford Village may now have geotechnical issues, whereas the sections on the south-eastern side of Tinline Terrace were untouched.
