= Lottery River =

Coordinates: 42°37′S 173°06′E

Location
- Country: New Zealand

Physical characteristics
- Source
  - location: Amuri Range
- Mouth
  - location: Mason River
- Length: 22 km (14 mi)

The Lottery River is a river of the north Canterbury region of New Zealand's South Island. It rises on the slopes of Mount Tinline, flowing generally south to meet with the Mason River 5 kilometres (3 mi) northeast of Waiau.

== See also ==
- List of rivers of New Zealand
