= Cheviot, New Zealand =

Town in Canterbury, New Zealand

Cheviot
- Town
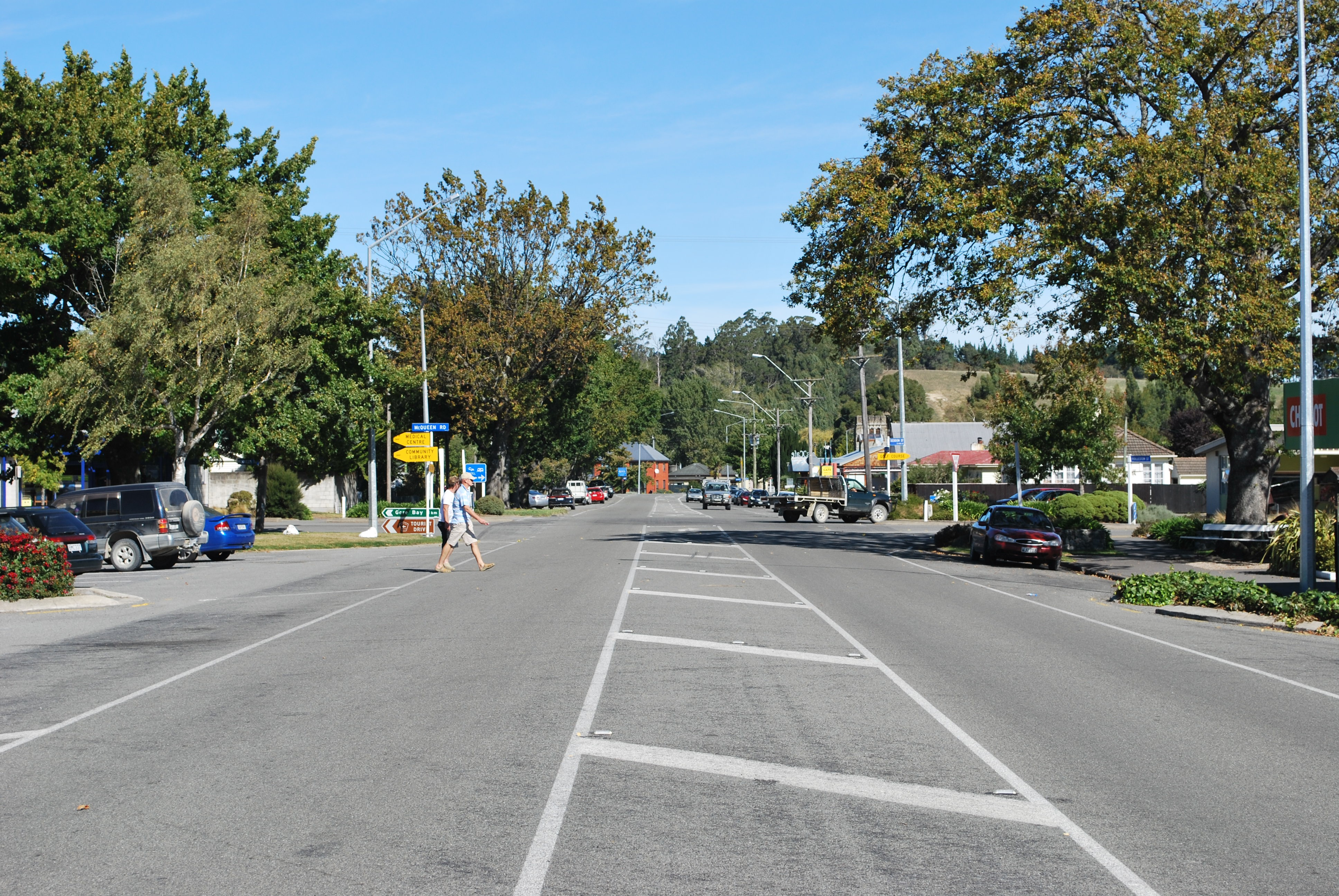
- Hall St (State Highway 1), the main street of Cheviot
- Interactive map of Cheviot
- Coordinates: 42°48′46″S 173°16′26″E
- Country: New Zealand
- Region: Canterbury
- Territorial authority: Hurunui District
- Ward: East Ward
- Electorates: Kaikōura; Te Tai Tonga

Government
  - Territorial Authority: Hurunui District Council
  - Regional council: Environment Canterbury
  - Mayor of Hurunui: Marie Black
  - Kaikoura MP: Stuart Smith
  - Te Tai Tonga MP: Tākuta Ferris

Area
  - Total: 1.05 km^{2} (0.41 sq mi)
- Elevation: 60 m (200 ft)

Population (June 2025)
  - Total: 410
  - Density: 390/km^{2} (1,000/sq mi)
- Time zone: UTC+12 (New Zealand Standard Time)
  - Summer (DST): UTC+13 (New Zealand Daylight Time)
- Postcode: 7310
- Area code: 03
- Local iwi: Ngāi Tahu
- Website: www.cheviotnz.com

Cheviot (/ˈtʃɛviət/) is a town in the Hurunui District of north Canterbury, on the east coast of the South Island of New Zealand. It is located on State Highway 1, approximately 112 kilometres (70 mi) north of Christchurch and 68 kilometres (42 mi) south of Kaikōura.

== History and naming ==
The government under Minister of Lands John McKenzie bought the Cheviot Hills estate between 1892 and 1893 from the descendants of William Robinson. The Cheviot Hills estate was broken into 54 farms and a township, which was originally called McKenzie. This name was "in widespread use for a decade or two" but gradually fell into disuse. The Cheviot county council was formed 1895. In 1901 the township had a population of 113.

A large earthquake measuring 6.9 hit near Cheviot on 16 November 1901. A number of buildings were badly damaged and one death was reported.

The post office was always known as Cheviot and by at least 1913 the township too was generally known as Cheviot. Cheviot Hills estate had been named by its original lease holder, John Scott Caverhill, after his home country, the Cheviot Hills straddling the Anglo-Scottish border.

The Robinson homestead burned down in 1936. Its foundations and grounds became part of the Cheviot Hills Domain, with the homestead's original front steps part of the cricket pavilion.

The Cheviot County rural water supply was opened in 1971. It cost $420,000 and supplies water to an area of 128,000 acres through 190 miles of pipes. A fountain, which sits outside the local school, was built to commemorate the event.

== Demographics ==
Cheviot is described by Stats NZ as a rural settlement and covers 1.05 km^{2} (0.41 sq mi). It had an estimated population of 410 as of June 2025, with a population density of 390 people per km^{2}. Cheviot is part of the larger Parnassus statistical area.

Historical population
Year	Pop.	±% p.a.
1901	219	—
2001	393	+0.59%
2006	390	−0.15%
2013	369	−0.79%
2018	372	+0.16%
2023	417	+2.31%

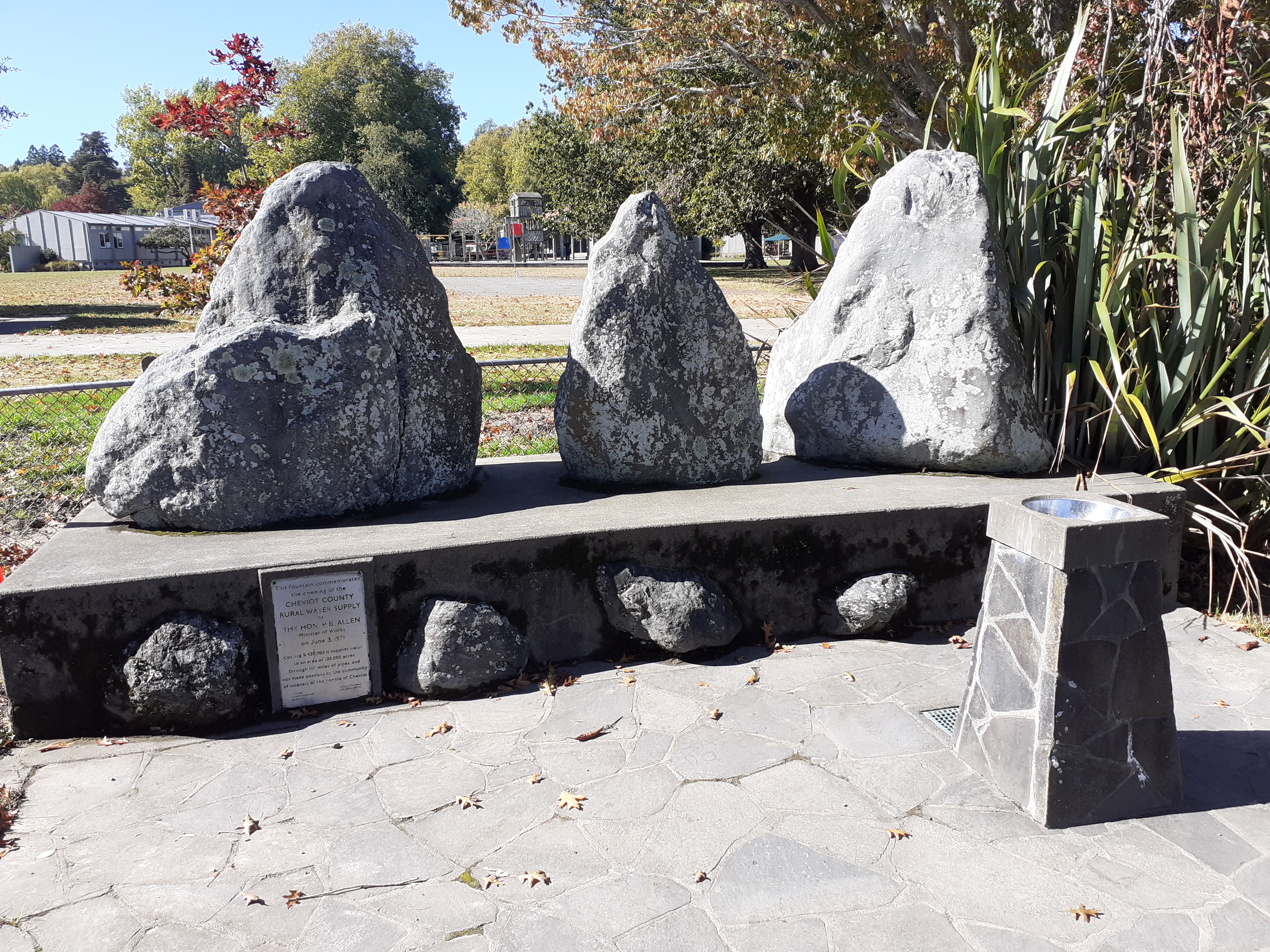
Cheviot County rural water supply fountain. Installed in 1971.

Cheviot had a population of 417 in the 2023 New Zealand census, an increase of 45 people (12.1%) since the 2018 census, and an increase of 48 people (13.0%) since the 2013 census. There were 210 males, 210 females, and 3 people of other genders in 186 dwellings. 1.4% of people identified as LGBTIQ+. The median age was 48.5 years (compared with 38.1 years nationally). There were 72 people (17.3%) aged under 15 years, 48 (11.5%) aged 15 to 29, 168 (40.3%) aged 30 to 64, and 129 (30.9%) aged 65 or older.

People could identify as more than one ethnicity. The results were 87.1% European (Pākehā), 18.0% Māori, 5.0% Pasifika, 4.3% Asian, and 1.4% other, which includes people giving their ethnicity as "New Zealander". English was spoken by 97.8%, Māori by 3.6%, Samoan by 0.7%, and other languages by 7.9%. No language could be spoken by 2.9% (e.g. too young to talk). The percentage of people born overseas was 14.4, compared with 28.8% nationally.

Religious affiliations were 35.3% Christian, 0.7% Hindu, 1.4% Māori religious beliefs, 0.7% New Age, and 0.7% other religions. People who answered that they had no religion were 51.1%, and 10.1% of people did not answer the census question.

Of those at least 15 years old, 33 (9.6%) people had a bachelor's or higher degree, 174 (50.4%) had a post-high school certificate or diploma, and 138 (40.0%) people exclusively held high school qualifications. The median income was $28,100, compared with $41,500 nationally. 12 people (3.5%) earned over $100,000 compared to 12.1% nationally. The employment status of those at least 15 was 129 (37.4%) full-time, 54 (15.7%) part-time, and 6 (1.7%) unemployed.

== The region ==
Cheviot is a service town for highway traffic and for a pastoral farming district that is currently predominant in sheep farming. Based in the township are a volunteer fire and ambulance services and one full-time police officer. Surrounding settlements include:

=== Domett ===
Originally a railway town, Domett is now only populated by farms and a petrol station. Next to the Old Main Road/Hurunui Mouth Road junction is the old Domett Railway Station, relocated and refurbished as a cafe. Domett Service Station provides after-hours sale of fuel (with surcharge): most service stations in the area close around 6pm.

=== Spotswood ===
Spotswood has an old hall that is still used regularly, and mainly consists of farms around Waiau East Road.

=== Parnassus ===
Parnassus has a higher population than the other settlements, although the local Parnassus School was closed in 2008. The famous Waiau River road/rail bridge was here, before being abandoned and replaced with a new road bridge. Prior to the opening of the old bridge in the 1930s a ferry across the river carried goods north and south. The Waiau River ends not far away; however, access to the river mouth must be made over farm property with the owners' permission. On the State Highway north of Parnassus is Leader Road which leads to the townships of Waiau, Rotherham, Culverden and Hanmer Springs.

=== Gore Bay ===
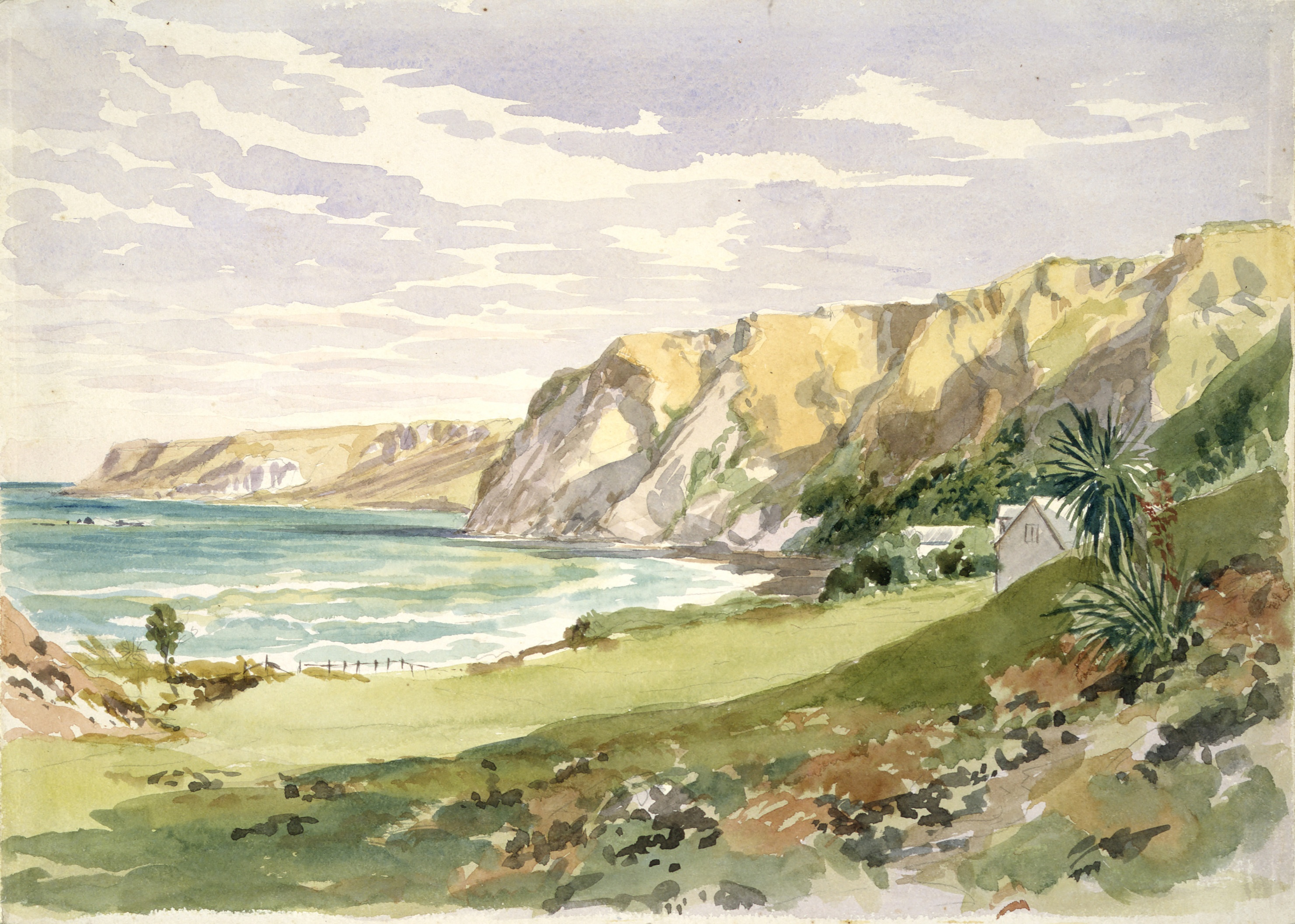
Gore Bay in 1874, with the house behind the cabbage tree belonging to Eliza Robinson

Gore Bay is a surfing beach with summer beach houses and 14 permanent residents. There are two local camping grounds, each with beach access and business. It is a popular New Year's Eve venue.

Of note is Cathedral Gully, a spectacular weathered clay canyon.

=== Port Robinson ===
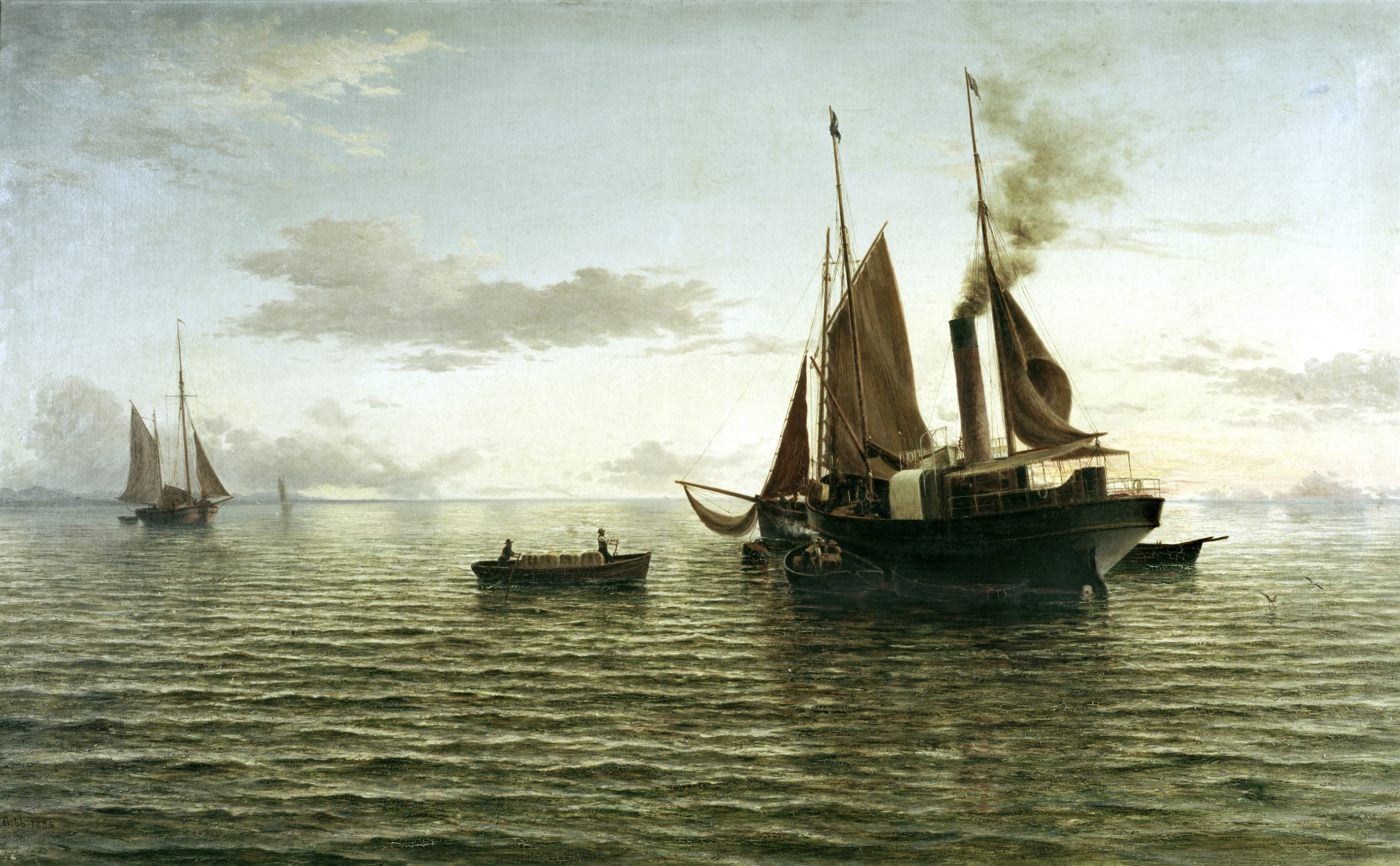
The Wool Season depicting the steamer Wakatu off Port Robinson, 1885, by John Gibb, oil on canvas

Once a prospering port, Port Robinson is now an abandoned wreck. The old wharf may still be seen, but it is in a dangerous state of disrepair.

=== Stonyhurst Station ===
Stonyhurst is a farming station in the Blythe Valley, southwest of Cheviot.

It was founded in 1851 by Frederick Weld and Charles Clifford. He had gained his impression when walking from Lyttelton to Flaxbourne, in Marlborough. Clifford landed sheep on the beach just south of the Blythe River which was later known as Stonyhurst Station, named after Stonyhurst College in England where they were both educated.

The farm originally occupied nearly 30,000 hectares (74,000 acres), the whole of the Blythe Valley. About 12,000 hectares (30,000 acres) was sold in 1863, and a further 4,000 hectares (9,900 acres) a decade later. In about 1900, much of the rest of the land was subdivided. The current station is about one tenth of the original area.

The area is described by the local authority as "a potentially significant natural area", and the manager's cottage is a Category II protected building under the Historic Places Act.

== Education ==
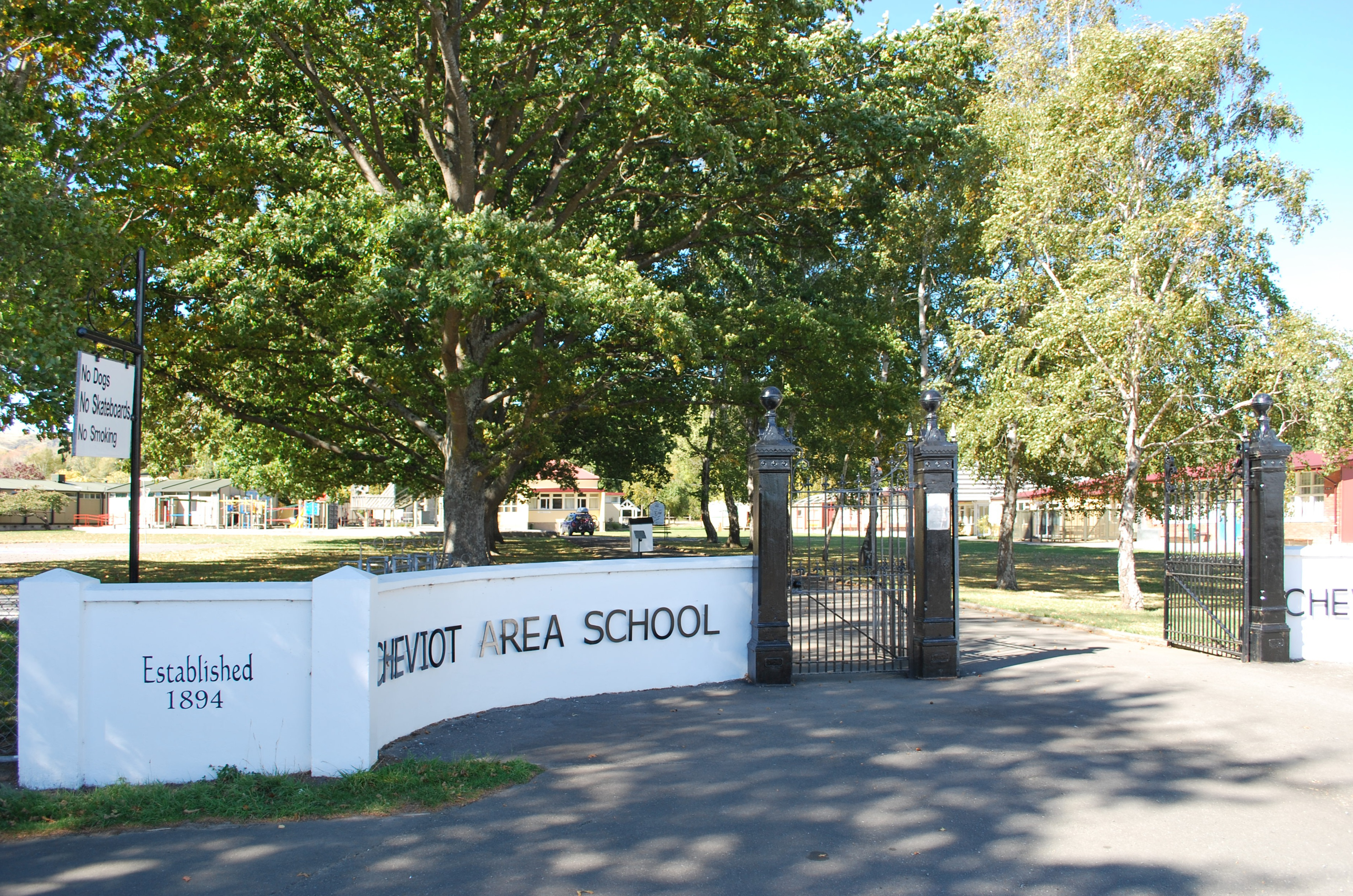
Cheviot Area School

Cheviot Area School is a composite school for years 1 to 13. It had a role of 172 (as of July 2026}. It opened in 1894 as the McKenzie School, and changed its name to Cheviot School in 1931. It became Cheviot District High School in 1937. In 1976 it became an area school.

The large oak trees in the school grounds were planted to commemorate those former students who died in World War 2.

Cheviot Area School competes in the Canterbury Area Schools Association Festival sporting competition with schools in Akaroa, Amuri, Hawarden, Oxford, and Rangiora. It also takes part in international exchanges with schools in Japan and Canada.

The township has two preschools, Cheviot Learning Centre and The Tree Hut.

Schools at Spotswood (1894-1931), Dommett (1895-1928), Port Robinson (1895-1920), Leamington (1896-1906), Conway Flat (1909-1915 and 1936-1972), Ethelton (1911-1935), Leadervale (1912-1913 and 1933-1936), Tormore (1915-1964), Parnassus (1918-2006) and Gore Bay (1925-1949) have closed with their catchments bolstering Cheviot.

== Climate ==
The mean yearly highest temperature for Cheviot from 2008–2024 was 34.8 °C (95 °F).

Climate data for Cheviot (1991–2020 normals, extremes 1982–present)
Month	Jan	Feb	Mar	Apr	May	Jun	Jul	Aug	Sep	Oct	Nov	Dec	Year
Record high °C (°F)	37.9 (100.2)	37.8 (100.0)	35.4 (95.7)	30.4 (86.7)	28.2 (82.8)	24.0 (75.2)	22.6 (72.7)	26.3 (79.3)	25.2 (77.4)	29.8 (85.6)	33.1 (91.6)	36.1 (97.0)	37.9 (100.2)
Mean daily maximum °C (°F)	23.3 (73.9)	23.2 (73.8)	21.0 (69.8)	18.1 (64.6)	15.5 (59.9)	12.3 (54.1)	12.2 (54.0)	13.2 (55.8)	15.0 (59.0)	17.6 (63.7)	19.1 (66.4)	21.5 (70.7)	17.7 (63.8)
Daily mean °C (°F)	17.0 (62.6)	16.7 (62.1)	14.6 (58.3)	11.7 (53.1)	9.6 (49.3)	6.7 (44.1)	6.6 (43.9)	7.5 (45.5)	9.5 (49.1)	11.5 (52.7)	13.2 (55.8)	15.4 (59.7)	11.7 (53.0)
Mean daily minimum °C (°F)	10.7 (51.3)	10.2 (50.4)	8.2 (46.8)	5.4 (41.7)	3.6 (38.5)	1.2 (34.2)	0.9 (33.6)	1.8 (35.2)	3.9 (39.0)	5.5 (41.9)	7.3 (45.1)	9.3 (48.7)	5.7 (42.2)
Record low °C (°F)	0.0 (32.0)	0.0 (32.0)	−4.4 (24.1)	−3.3 (26.1)	−6.3 (20.7)	−7.9 (17.8)	−8.1 (17.4)	−6.0 (21.2)	−4.9 (23.2)	−4.4 (24.1)	−3.0 (26.6)	−2.0 (28.4)	−8.1 (17.4)
Average rainfall mm (inches)	37.3 (1.47)	52.7 (2.07)	47.9 (1.89)	66.4 (2.61)	54.5 (2.15)	82.8 (3.26)	66.7 (2.63)	62.0 (2.44)	51.3 (2.02)	70.3 (2.77)	46.3 (1.82)	45.0 (1.77)	683.2 (26.9)
Mean monthly sunshine hours	257.6	219.8	199.6	165.2	164.0	134.7	148.8	169.5	200.0	221.4	242.2	235.6	2,358.4
Source: NIWA

== See also ==
- 1901 Cheviot earthquake
- Manuka Bay
