= Hanmer River =

Coordinates: 42°34′10″S 172°51′12″E

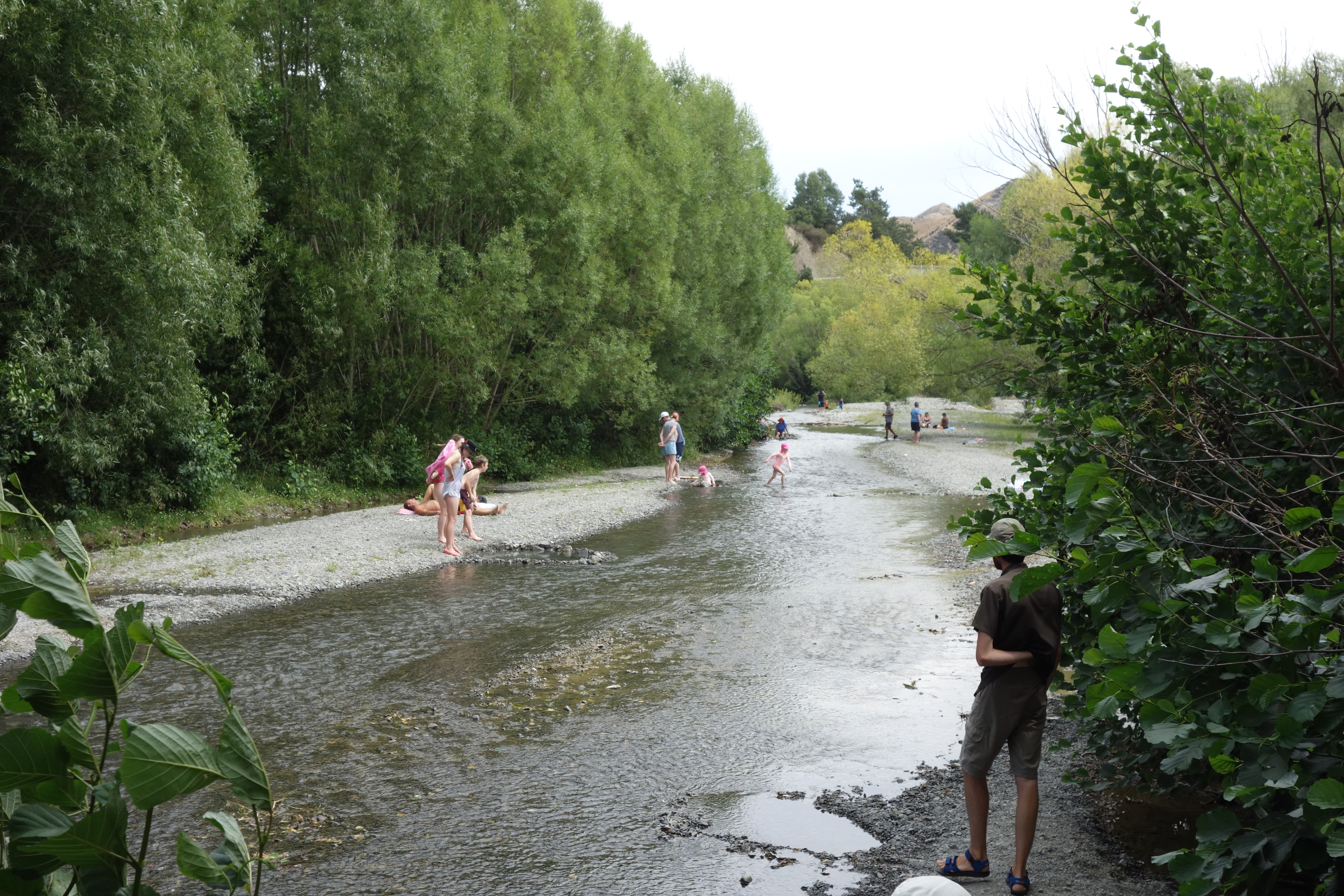
- The Hanmer River just downstream from the State Highway 7A bridge is a popular swimming spot

- Location of the mouth within New Zealand

Location
- Country: New Zealand

Physical characteristics
- Source
  - location: Hurunui District
- Mouth
  - location: Waiau Uwha River

The Hanmer River is a river in the Hurunui District of New Zealand. It originates in the Hossack Saddle between the Hanmer Range and the Amuri Range, and flows south-west into the Waiau Uwha River about 8 kilometres (5.0 mi) south-west of Hanmer Springs.

== See also ==
- List of rivers of New Zealand
