= Rotherham, New Zealand =

Town in Canterbury, New Zealand

Rotherham
- town
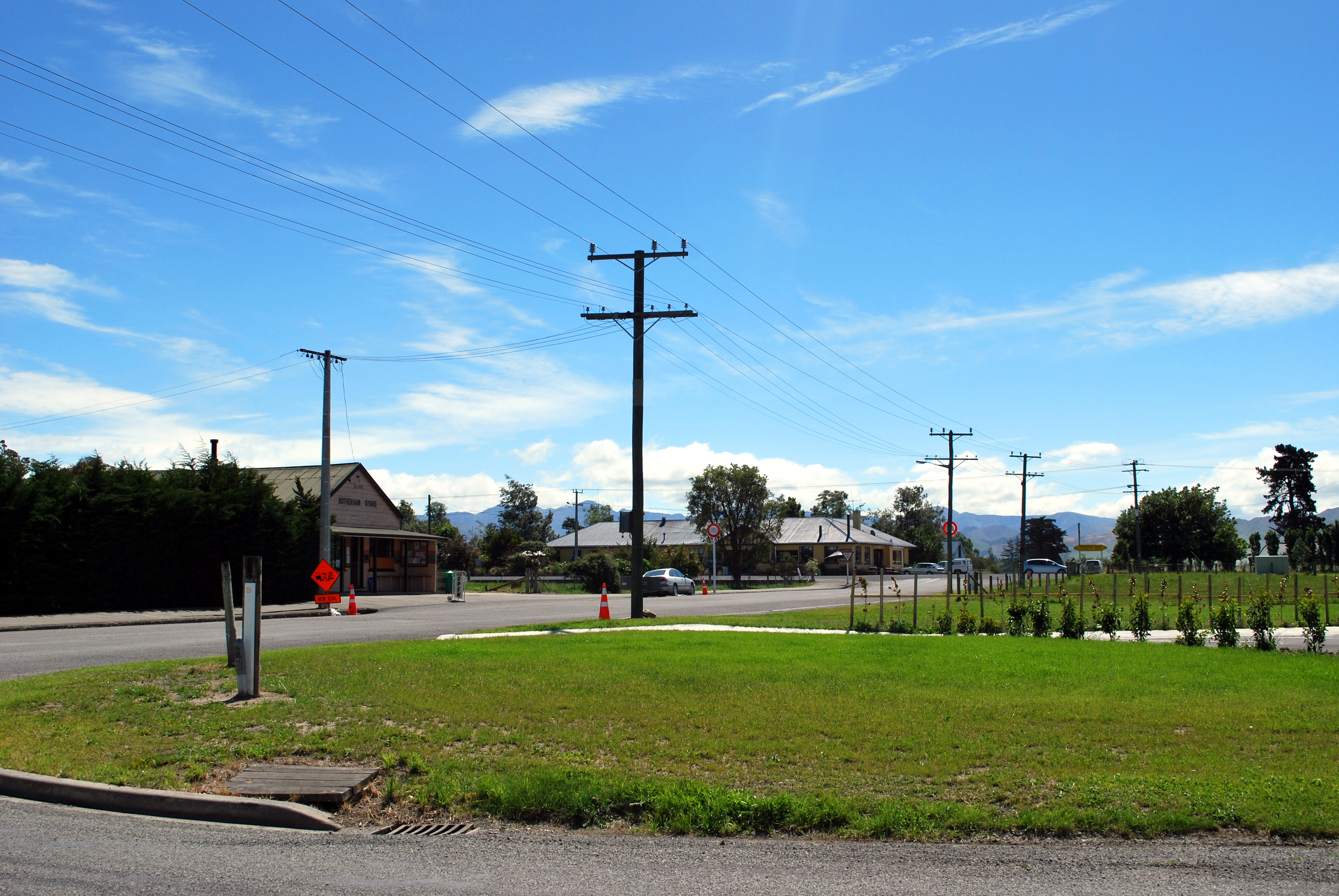
- George Street, Rotherham's main street
- Interactive map of Rotherham
- Coordinates: 42°42′S 172°57′E
- Country: New Zealand
- Region: Canterbury
- Territorial authority: Hurunui District
- Ward: West Ward
- Electorates: Kaikōura; Te Tai Tonga

Government
  - Territorial Authority: Hurunui District Council
  - Regional council: Environment Canterbury
  - Mayor of Hurunui: Marie Black
  - Kaikoura MP: Stuart Smith
  - Te Tai Tonga MP: Tākuta Ferris

Area
  - Total: 0.56 km^{2} (0.22 sq mi)

Population (June 2025)
  - Total: 150
  - Density: 270/km^{2} (690/sq mi)
- Time zone: UTC+12 (New Zealand Standard Time)
  - Summer (DST): UTC+13 (New Zealand Daylight Time)
- Postcode: 7379

Rotherham is a small village in the Hurunui District of the Canterbury region in New Zealand's South Island. It is between Culverden and Waiau on the Inland Kaikōura Road, on the northernmost part of the Amuri Plain. It lies near the south bank of the Waiau Uwha River, a popular location for trout and salmon fishing.

On 8 February 1886, a railway was opened to Culverden, but construction then stalled as debate raged about the final route and destination of the line. Some proposals included a line through Rotherham, and in 1914, work finally began on extending the line to Waiau via Rotherham. This extension was opened on 15 December 1919 and the line became known as the Waiau Branch.

Rotherham station had a relatively large station building by the standard of rural New Zealand stations, possibly due to plans that suggested terminating the line in Rotherham rather than in Waiau. The station also had stockyards and a goods shed; the stockyards were removed in 1970, and the goods shed was sold and relocated by July 1975.

The railway itself closed on 15 January 1978, with the station building left in its original location and acquired for use by a local farmer.

The Inland Kaikoura Road was formerly New Zealand State Highway 70; the state highway designation was revoked in 2004.

== Demographics ==
Rotherham is described by Stats NZ as a rural settlement and covers 0.56 km^{2} (0.22 sq mi). It had an estimated population of 150 as of June 2025, with a population density of 268 people per km^{2}. Rotherham is part of the larger Amuri statistical area.

Historical population
Year	Pop.	±% p.a.
2006	102	—
2013	117	+1.98%
2018	144	+4.24%
2023	150	+0.82%

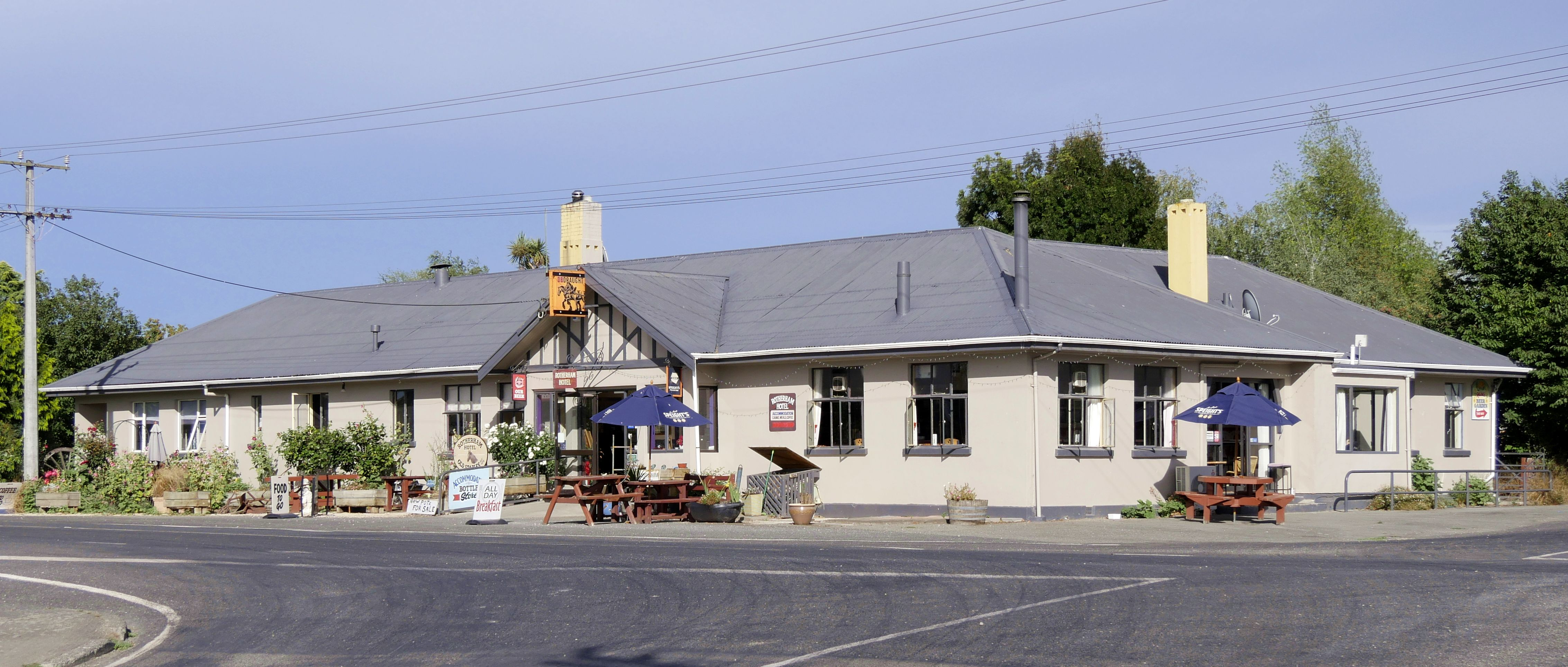
Rotherham Hotel

Rotherham had a population of 150 in the 2023 New Zealand census, an increase of 6 people (4.2%) since the 2018 census, and an increase of 33 people (28.2%) since the 2013 census. There were 81 males and 69 females in 69 dwellings. 2.0% of people identified as LGBTIQ+. The median age was 56.5 years (compared with 38.1 years nationally). There were 30 people (20.0%) aged under 15 years, 9 (6.0%) aged 15 to 29, 72 (48.0%) aged 30 to 64, and 42 (28.0%) aged 65 or older.

People could identify as more than one ethnicity. The results were 90.0% European (Pākehā); 8.0% Māori; 2.0% Pasifika; 6.0% Asian; 2.0% Middle Eastern, Latin American and African New Zealanders (MELAA); and 4.0% other, which includes people giving their ethnicity as "New Zealander". English was spoken by 98.0%, Māori by 4.0%, and other languages by 6.0%. No language could be spoken by 4.0% (e.g. too young to talk). The percentage of people born overseas was 12.0, compared with 28.8% nationally.

Religious affiliations were 26.0% Christian, 2.0% Islam, and 2.0% Māori religious beliefs. People who answered that they had no religion were 62.0%, and 8.0% of people did not answer the census question.

Of those at least 15 years old, 6 (5.0%) people had a bachelor's or higher degree, 69 (57.5%) had a post-high school certificate or diploma, and 45 (37.5%) people exclusively held high school qualifications. The median income was $29,900, compared with $41,500 nationally. 12 people (10.0%) earned over $100,000 compared to 12.1% nationally. The employment status of those at least 15 was 48 (40.0%) full-time and 21 (17.5%) part-time.

== Education ==
Rotherham School is a co-educational state primary school for Year 1 to 6 students, with a roll of 35 as of July 2026. It was built about 1880.
