= Hundalee Hills =

Hills in Canterbury Region, New Zealand

Coordinates: 42°33′37″S 173°24′37″E

The Hundalee Hills are located close to the borders of Hurunui District and Kaikōura District in Canterbury in the South Island of New Zealand.

Located 40 kilometres (24.85 mi) to the south of Kaikōura, Hundalee Hills are known largely for a notorious stretch of State Highway 1 between Kaikōura and Christchurch. The road winds sharply around the edge of several hills, as does the Conway River, which reaches the Pacific Ocean close to the Hundalees.

Within the Hundalee Hills is the rural locality of Hundalee. This was briefly a terminus of the Main North Line railway that winds its way through the Hundalee Hills, and it was also the home of World War II hero Charles Upham after he returned from combat.
