= Percival River =

Coordinates: 42°33′S 172°48′E

Location
- Country: New Zealand

Physical characteristics
- Source
  - location: Hanmer Range
- Mouth
  - location: Waiau River
- Length: 14 km (8.7 mi)

The Percival River is a river of the Canterbury region of New Zealand's South Island. It flows southwest from its origins in the Hanmer Range to the northeast of Hanmer Springs, reaching the Waiau River 7 kilometres (4 mi) south of the town.

== See also ==
- List of rivers of New Zealand
