= Grantham River =

Coordinates: 42°34′S 172°42′E

- Location of the mouth within New Zealand

Location
- Country: New Zealand

Physical characteristics
- Source
  - location: Hanmer Range
- Mouth
  - location: Waiau Uwha River

The Grantham River is a river in the Canterbury region of New Zealand. It arises in the Hanmer Range near Mount Miromiro, in the Hanmer Forest Park, and flows south-east into the Waiau Uwha River, which has its mouth on the Pacific Ocean.

A thermal spring on the river is undeveloped.

The Grantham River forms part of the Waiau Uwha catchment in North Canterbury. It flows through predominantly natural hill country typical of the region’s braided river systems.

== See also ==
- List of rivers of New Zealand
