= Leader River =

River in New Zealand

Coordinates: 42°44′S 173°18′E

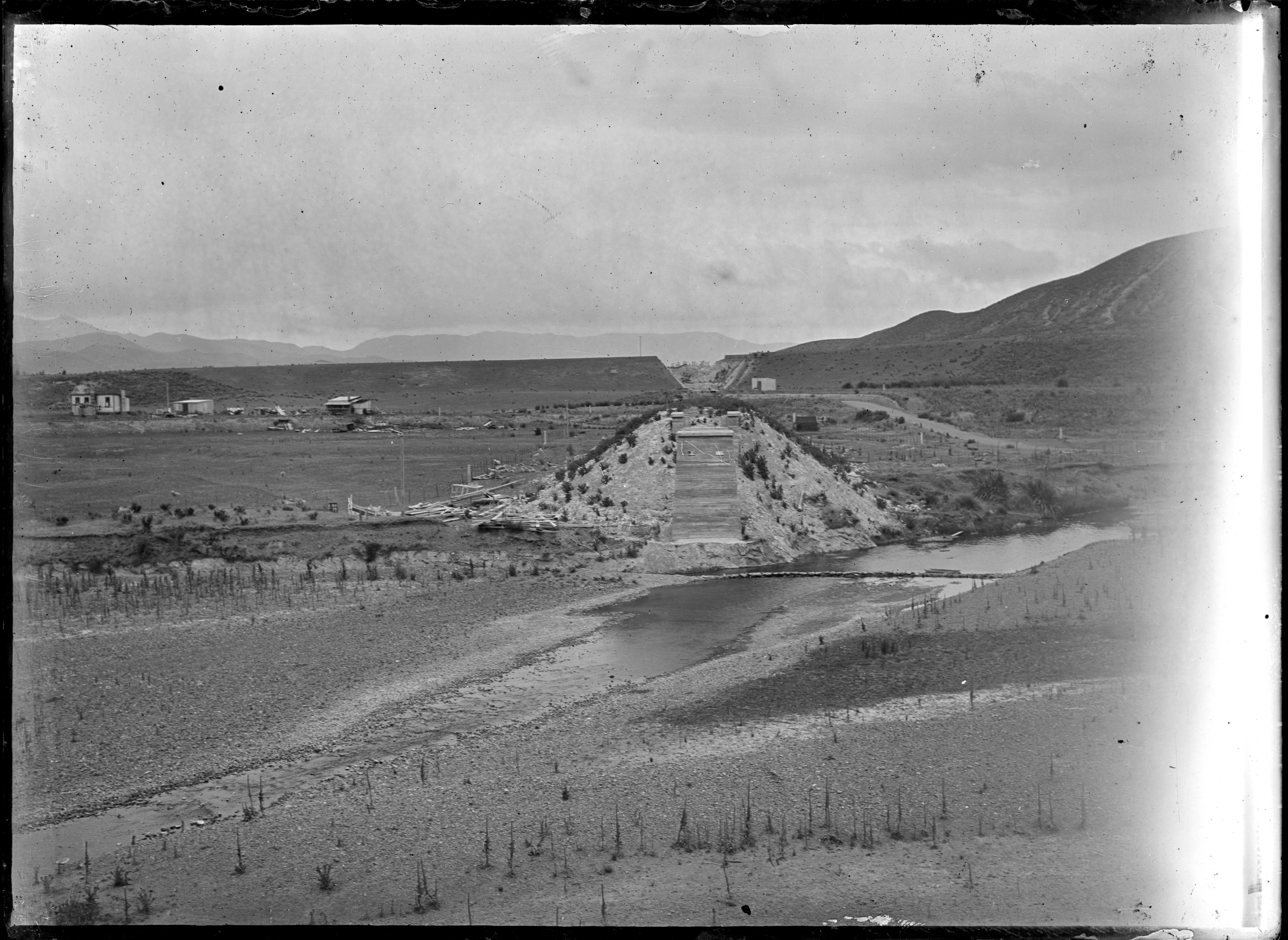
Piers for a bridge to cross the Leader River. Photograph taken by Albert Percy Godber circa 1917.

The Leader River is a river in the Hurunui District of the Canterbury region in New Zealand's South Island. It is a tributary of the Waiau River, which it meets near Parnassus. Numerous smaller watercourses join the Leader River, including the Hookhamsnyvy Creek.

In the 1910s, the New Zealand Railways Department intended to build a railway up the Leader River's valley as part of the Main North Line linking Christchurch with the Marlborough region. Between 1912 and 1914, roughly 3 kilometres (2 mi) of track was laid northwards from Parnassus up the Leader River's valley, a few more kilometres of formation was made, and work began on a bridge over the Leader River. However, the outbreak of World War I brought a halt to construction, and when work resumed on building the railway, a more easterly route out of Parnassus was chosen. Nonetheless, a pier from the never-completed Leader River bridge continues to stand in the river.
