= Stanley River (Canterbury) =

Coordinates: 42°23′46″S 172°37′17″E

- Location of the mouth within New Zealand

Location
- Country: New Zealand

Physical characteristics
- Source
  - elevation: 1,560 m (5,120 ft)
- Mouth
  - location: Waiau Uwha River
  - elevation: 615 m (2,018 ft)
- Length: 20 km (12 mi)

The Stanley River is a river of the Canterbury region of New Zealand's South Island. An upper tributary of the Waiau Uwha River, it rises on the southern flanks of the St James Range and flows southwest to reach the Waiau Uwha 17 kilometres (11 mi) east of the Lewis Pass. Lake Guyon drains to the Stanley River via a swampy tributary named Stanley Vale. In its lower reaches the river passes through a gorge known as Stanley Gate. The Fowler Pass Track follows the river for much of its length.
