= Edwards River (North Canterbury) =

Coordinates: 42°26′35″S 172°36′10″E

- Location of the mouth within New Zealand

Location
- Country: New Zealand

Physical characteristics
- Source
  - location: Saint James Range
  - elevation: 1420m
- Mouth
  - location: Waiau Uwha River
  - elevation: 550m
- Length: 15 km (9.3 mi)

The Edwards River is a river located in the north of New Zealand's Canterbury region. It is the northern of the two rivers in New Zealand of this name.

== Characteristics ==
A tributary of the Waiau Uwha River, it skirts the northern slopes of the Hanmer Range, flowing south then west for 15 km before joining the Waiau Uwha.

The river rises on the southern slopes of the Saint James Range, close to Mount Horrible and Mount Sadd. It initially flows south through a steep sided valley before turning westwards. In its middle reaches, the river's valley is broad and wide, with the river becoming a braided river with shingle banks. At its western end, it passes through a steep-sided gorge close to its junction with the Waiau Uwha.
