= Wharanui =

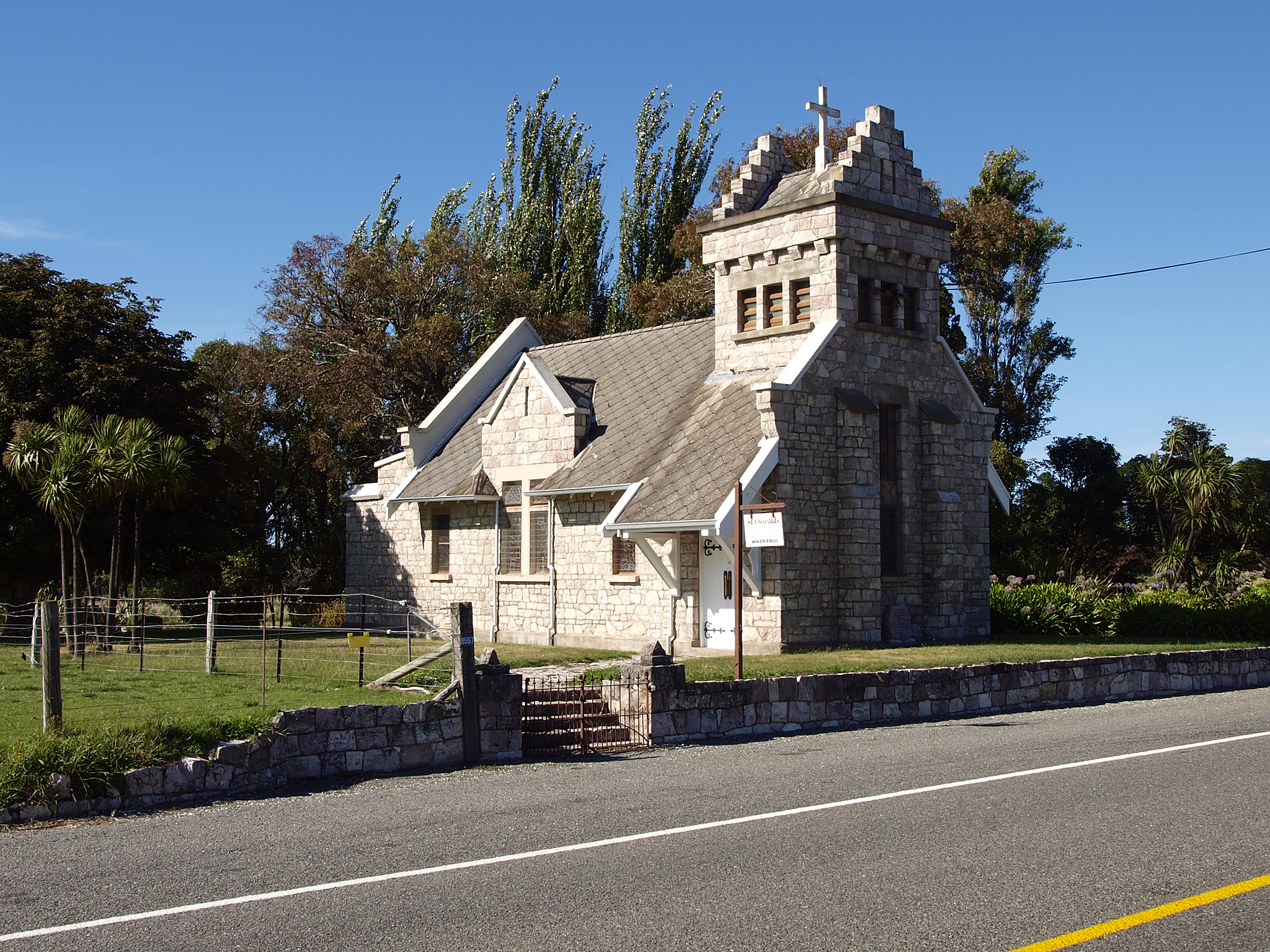
- Small Anglican Church St Oswalds, Wharanui
- Interactive map of Wharanui
- Coordinates: 41°55′27″S 174°5′28″E
- Country: New Zealand
- Region: Marlborough
- Ward: Wairau-Awatere General Ward; Marlborough Māori Ward
- Electorates: Kaikōura; Te Tai Tonga (Māori)

Government
  - Territorial Authority: Marlborough District Council
  - Marlborough District Mayor: Nadine Taylor
  - Kaikōura MP: Stuart Smith
  - Te Tai Tonga MP: Tākuta Ferris

Wharanui is a small village located in Marlborough on the east coast of New Zealand's South Island between Ward and Kaikōura. State Highway 1 and the Main North Line railway both pass through the village.

For over a decade, Wharanui was the southern terminus of a railway that ran from Picton south through Blenheim. The railway reached Wharanui by 1915. It was intended to continue the line southwards via Kaikōura to a line being built north from Christchurch that had its current terminus in Parnassus, but World War I stopped construction and Wharanui remained the southern terminus of the isolated Blenheim section. Work south from Wharanui did not recommence until 1928, and delays caused by the Great Depression and World War II meant the line was not completed until 1945. Wharanui railway station is still in use today, primarily as the southern base for bank engines used to help heavy trains on the line from Picton.

A small church is located in Wharanui, called St Oswald's Church. This was damaged in the 2016 Kaikōura earthquake. Earthquake repair was complete by March 2025.
