= Mason River =

Coordinates: 42°39′S 173°02′E

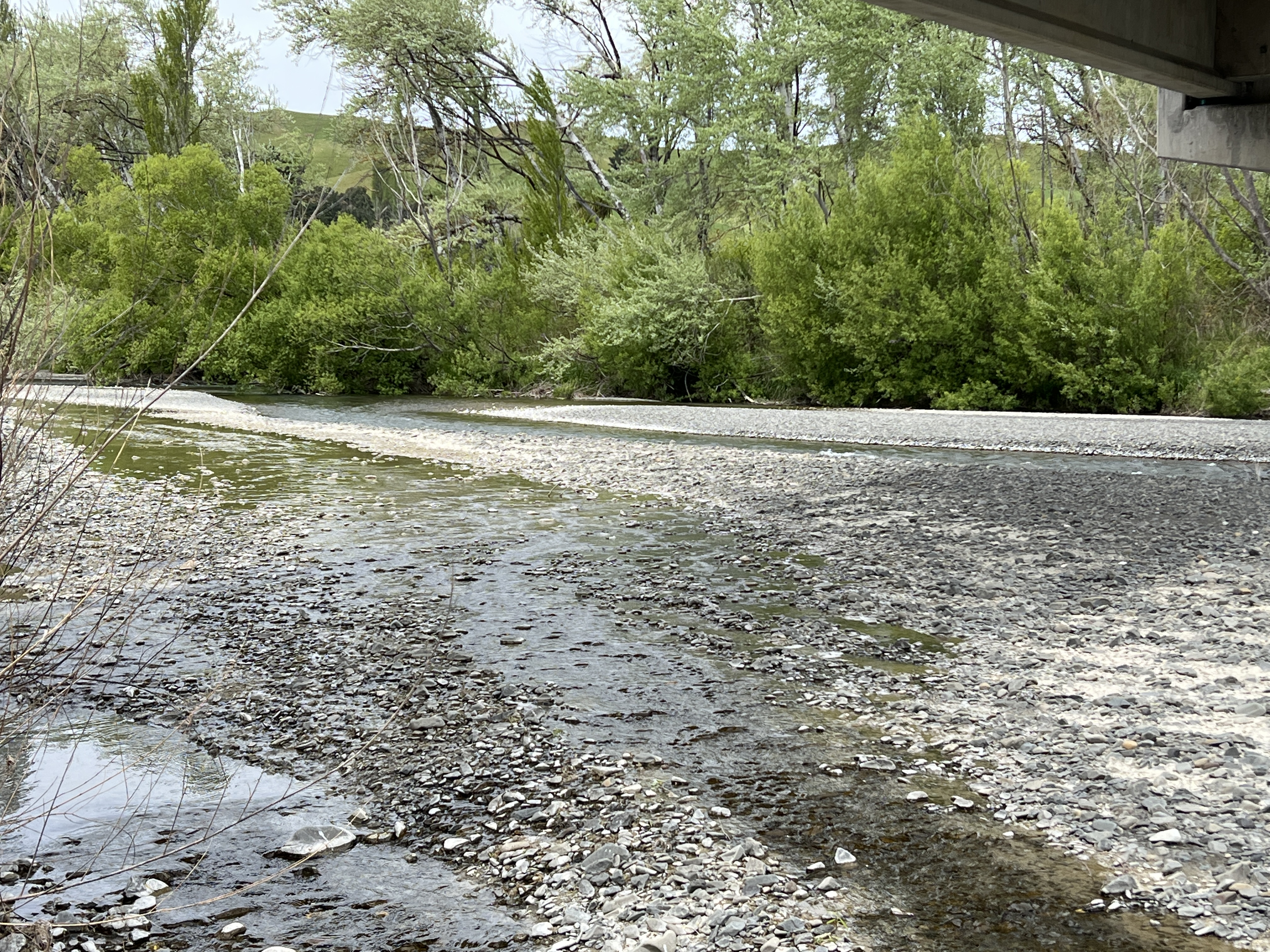

Location
- Country: New Zealand

Physical characteristics
- Source
  - location: Amuri Range
- Mouth
  - location: Waiau River
- Length: 36 km (22 mi)

The Mason River is a river of the north Canterbury region of New Zealand's South Island. It flows south from the Amuri Range, at the foot of the Mason Hills before turning southwest to reach the Waiau River just to the west of the township of Waiau.

== See also ==
- List of rivers of New Zealand
