= Conway River (New Zealand) =

Coordinates: 42°37′S 173°28′E

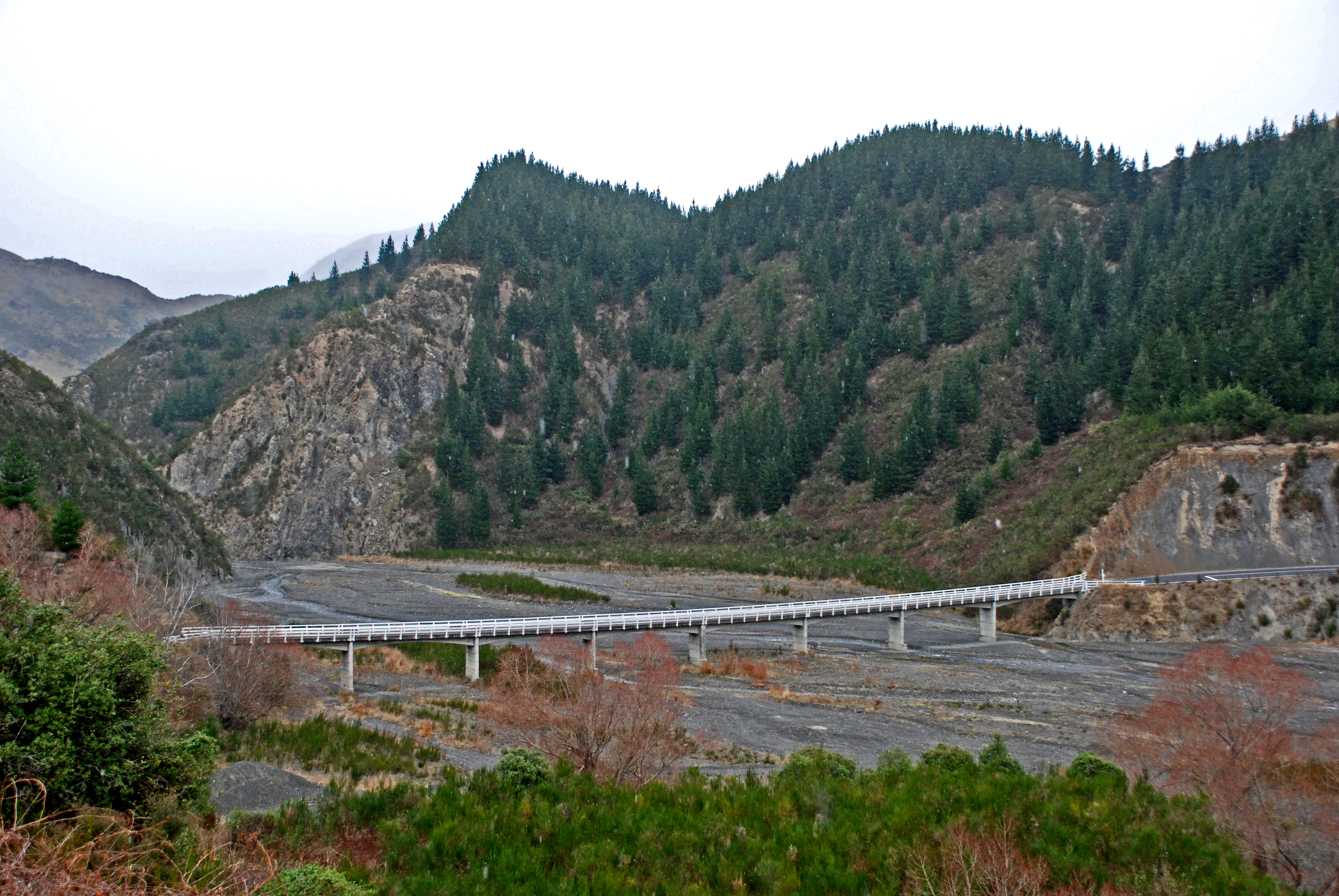
- Conway River Bridge, Inland Kaikōura Road

Location
- Country: New Zealand

Physical characteristics
- Source
  - location: Amuri Range
- Mouth
  - location: Pacific Ocean
  - elevation: 0 m (0 ft)

The Conway River is part of the traditional boundary between the Canterbury and Marlborough regions in the South Island of New Zealand.

It arises in the Amuri Range near Palmer Saddle and runs for 30 kilometres (19 mi) south-east through the Hundalee Hills at the south end of the Seaward Kaikōura Mountains before turning north-east and reaching the Pacific Ocean 30 km (19 mi) south of Kaikōura. The Charwell River is a tributary. It was probably named after the River Conwy in North Wales, as this was the origin of Thomas Hanmer, an owner of Hawkeswood Station near this river during the 1850s.
