= Waiau Uwha River =

Waiau Uwha
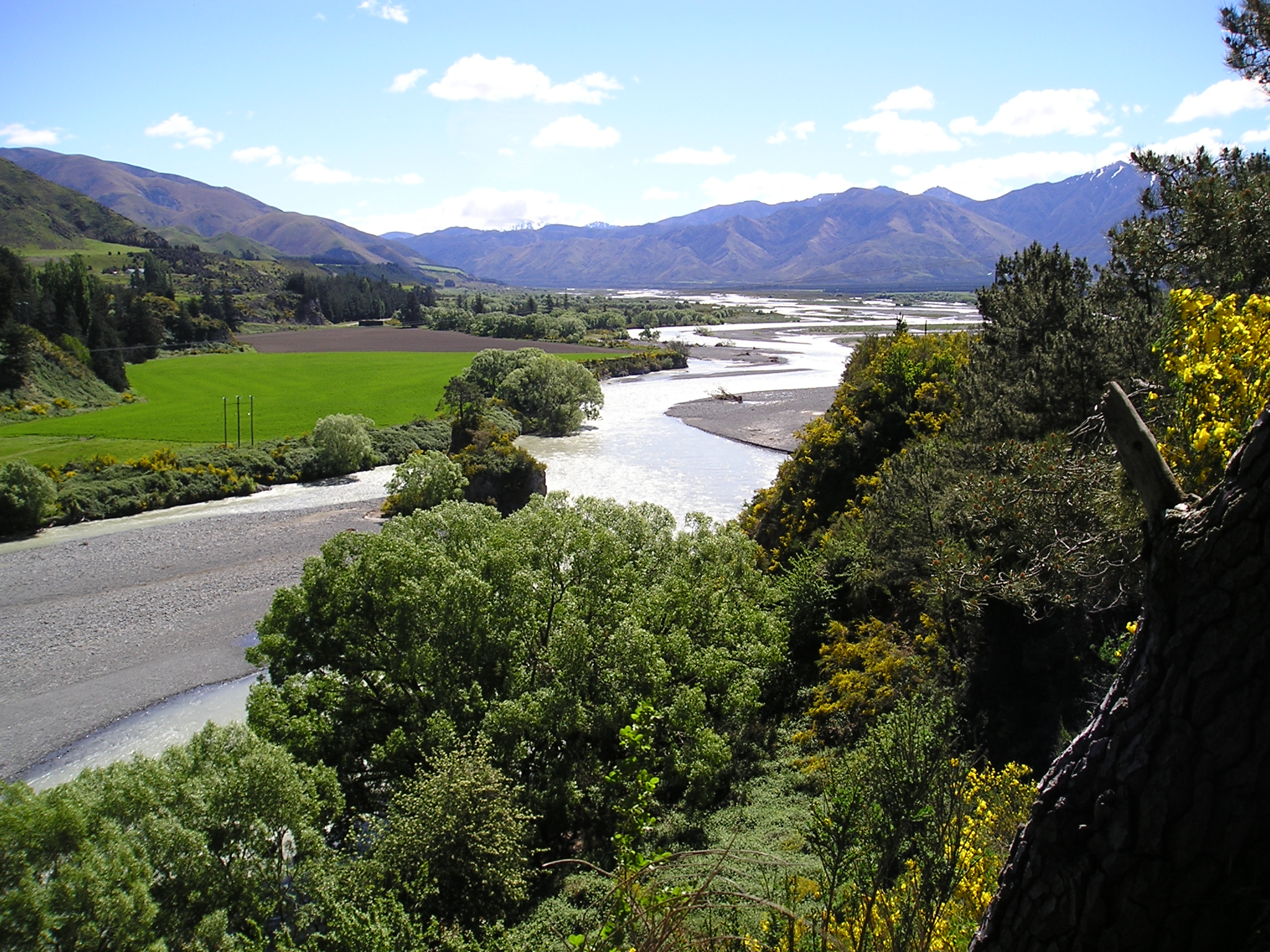
- Waiau Uwha River upstream from the Waiau Ferry Bridge, near Hanmer Springs

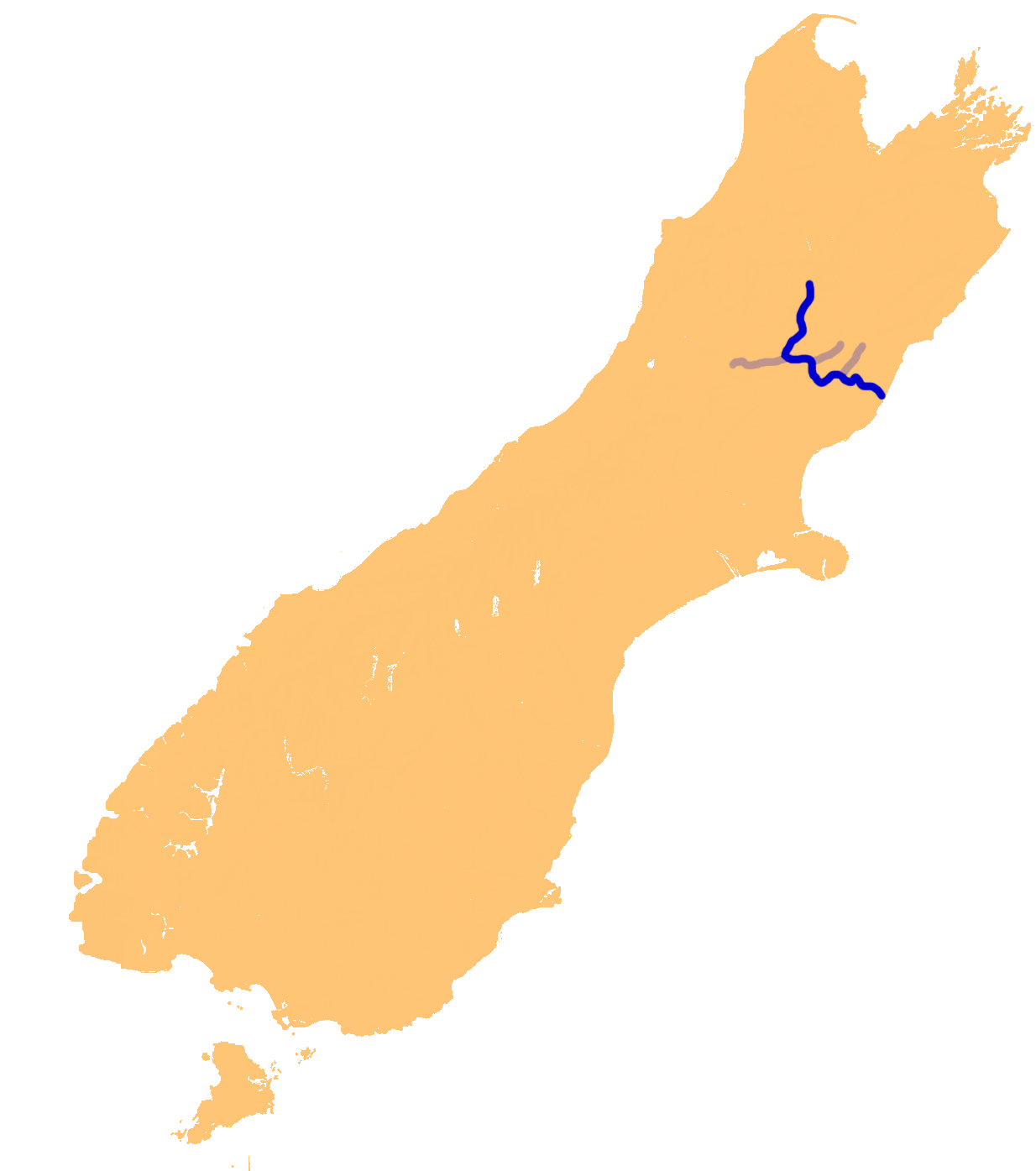
- Waiau River system

Location
- Country: New Zealand
- Region: Canterbury
- District: Hurunui
- City: Hanmer Springs, Waiau, Parnassus

Physical characteristics
- Source: Southern Alps
  - location: Spenser Mountains, New Zealand
  - coordinates: 42°6′39″S 172°38′42″E
- Mouth: Pacific Ocean
  - location: New Zealand
  - coordinates: 42°46′40″S 173°22′19″E
  - elevation: 0 m (0 ft)
- Basin size: 3,310 km^{2} (1,280 sq mi)

Basin features
- Tributaries
  - left: Stanley River, Edwards River, Grantham River, Percival River, Hanmer River, Mason River, Stanton River, Leader River
  - right: Ada River, Henry River, Hope River

Waiau Uwha River, previously known as the Waiau River, is a river in north Canterbury in the South Island of New Zealand. The Waiau Uwha River is a braided river approximately 160 kilometres (99 mi) in length, starting in the Spenser Mountains and flowing southeast, entering the South Pacific Ocean about 50 kilometres (31 mi) southeast of Kaikōura. The river has the second largest catchment of North Canterbury's rivers at 3,310 square kilometres (1,280 mi^{2}).

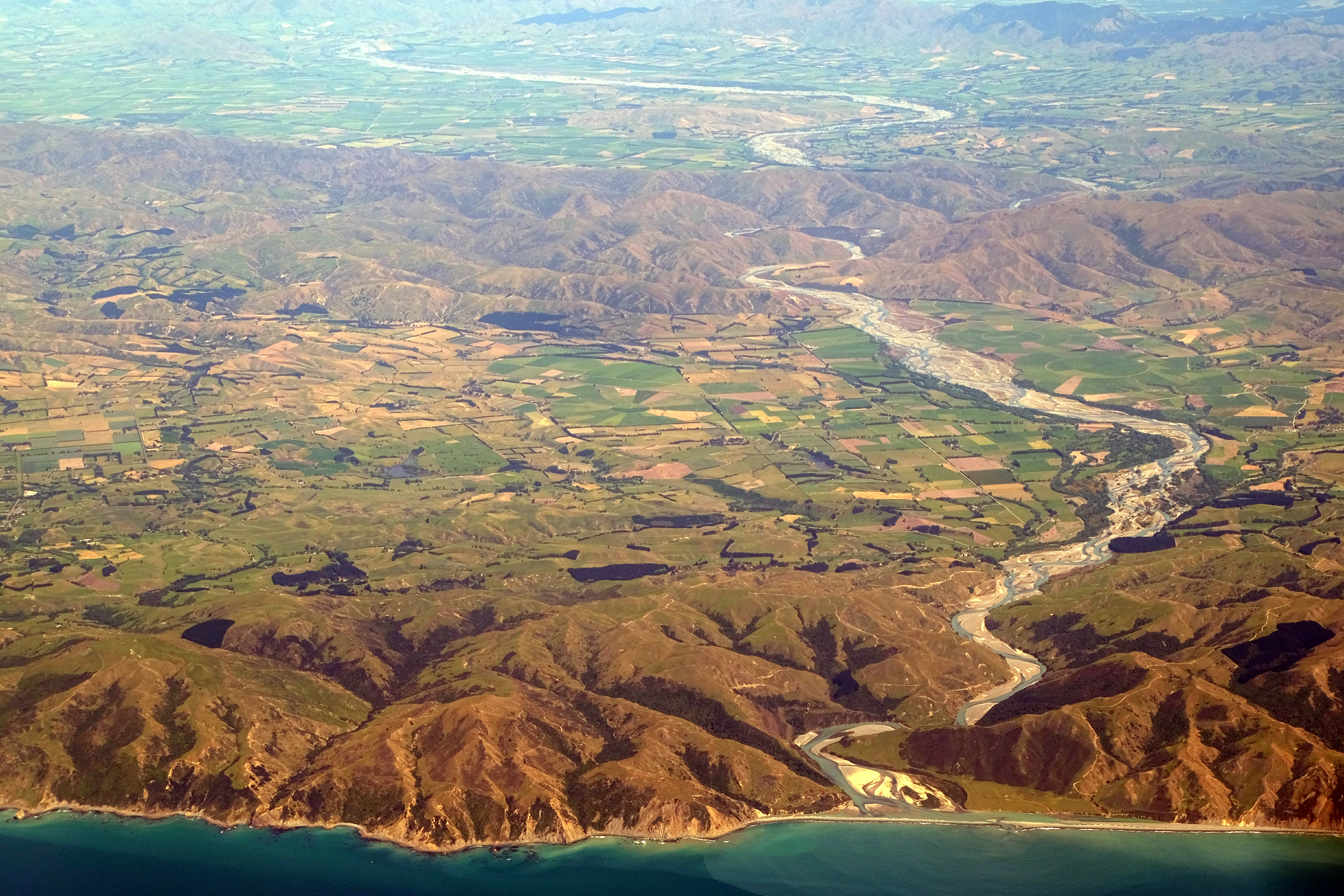
The Waiau river in November 2015

The name of the river was officially changed in 2018 from Waiau River to Waiau Uwha River to reflect its original Māori name, following a proposal made by local iwi Ngāi Tahu. The name Waiau Uwha comes from a local story which tells of the river having lamented its gradual separation from the nearby Waiau Toa River, and when the river is in high flow it is the tears of the separated lovers. The two rivers are distinguished by uwha meaning female, and toa meaning male.

The river is visited by multiple bird species native to New Zealand, including near-threatened or endangered species such as the black-billed gull and wrybill. There is a strong population of black-backed gulls at the river, which have been seen attacking the endangered black-fronted terns.

Research published in 2024 showed that the river has narrowed since the mid-1990s following the encroachment of agricultural land-use, with some parts of the channel showing nearly 50% reduction in width.

In December 2025, a health warning was issued for the south bank tributary of the river due to a toxic algae bloom, reporting moderate to high levels of cyanobacteria. Council monitoring released earlier the same year had rated the river unsuitable for swimming, grading the water quality as 'very poor'.
