= Leithfield =

Town in Canterbury, New Zealand

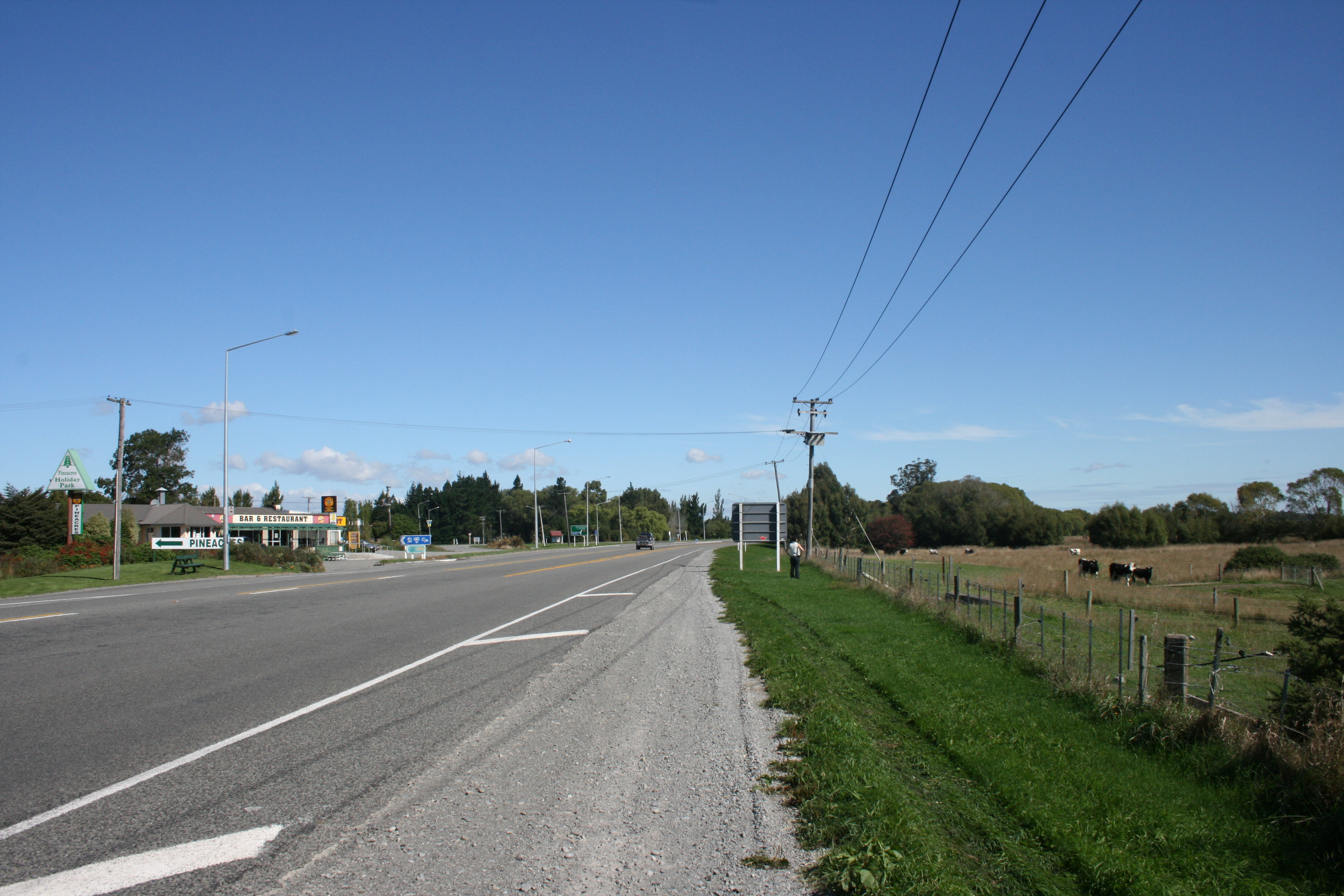
- State Highway 1 at the turn off to Kaiapoi
- Interactive map of Leithfield
- Coordinates: 43°12′S 172°44′E
- Country: New Zealand
- Region: Canterbury
- Territorial authority: Hurunui District
- Ward: South Ward
- Electorates: Kaikōura; Te Tai Tonga

Government
  - Territorial Authority: Hurunui District Council
  - Regional council: Environment Canterbury
  - Mayor of Hurunui: Marie Black
  - Kaikoura MP: Stuart Smith
  - Te Tai Tonga MP: Tākuta Ferris

Area
  - Total: 1.58 km^{2} (0.61 sq mi)

Population (June 2025)
  - Total: 1,060
  - Density: 671/km^{2} (1,740/sq mi)

Leithfield is a small town in north Canterbury, New Zealand. It is on State Highway 1, 5 kilometres (3.1 mi) south of Amberley and 42 kilometres (26 mi) north of Christchurch and 11.8 kilometres north of Waikuku. The Leithfield area consists of two semi-distinct areas, Leithfield Beach to the east of State Highway 1 and Leithfield Village adjacent to and immediately to the west of State Highway 1. Leithfield sits just south of the South Branch of the Kowai River.

Leithfield's regional importance is behind that of Amberley with its wine industry and the tourist centre of Hanmer Springs. This is due in large part to its proximity to the district centre at Amberley. Despite this proximity, the Leithfield community supports a school, library, summer swimming pool, and many small businesses.

== History ==
Leithfield was founded in 1857 by John Leith. He purchased a windmill in 1862 and brought it from Christchurch to Leithfield in order to mill wheat. The mill building was 23 metres tall and each sail was 12 metres long making it the tallest building in Canterbury at the time. Unfortunately the Canterbury nor'westerly winds damaged the mill building making it inoperable. In 1880, Leithfield was a town of 700 people. It had three churches, a police station, a court, a school, three hotels and five shops.

== Demographics ==
Leithfield and Leithfield Beach are each described by Stats NZ as rural settlements and cover 1.29 km^{2} (0.50 sq mi) and 0.29 km^{2} (0.11 sq mi) respectively. They had an estimated combined population of 1,060 as of June 2025, with a population density of 671 people per km^{2}. Both are included in Balcairn statistical area.

Historical population for Leithfield and Leithfield Beach
Year	Pop.	±% p.a.
2006	765	—
2013	954	+3.20%
2018	981	+0.56%
2023	1,056	+1.48%

The two settlements had a population of 1,056 in the 2023 New Zealand census, an increase of 75 people (7.6%) since the 2018 census, and an increase of 102 people (10.7%) since the 2013 census. There were 531 males, 519 females, and 3 people of other genders in 426 dwellings. 3.4% of people identified as LGBTIQ+. There were 189 people (17.9%) aged under 15 years, 126 (11.9%) aged 15 to 29, 525 (49.7%) aged 30 to 64, and 216 (20.5%) aged 65 or older.

People could identify as more than one ethnicity. The results were 94.0% European (Pākehā); 12.5% Māori; 2.3% Pasifika; 1.7% Asian; 1.1% Middle Eastern, Latin American and African New Zealanders (MELAA); and 3.4% other, which includes people giving their ethnicity as "New Zealander". English was spoken by 98.0%, Māori by 2.3%, Samoan by 0.3%, and other languages by 4.5%. No language could be spoken by 2.3% (e.g. too young to talk). New Zealand Sign Language was known by 0.3%. The percentage of people born overseas was 13.1, compared with 28.8% nationally.

Religious affiliations were 23.0% Christian, 0.3% Buddhist, 1.1% New Age, and 1.4% other religions. People who answered that they had no religion were 63.4%, and 10.5% of people did not answer the census question.

Of those at least 15 years old, 114 (13.1%) people had a bachelor's or higher degree, 522 (60.2%) had a post-high school certificate or diploma, and 231 (26.6%) people exclusively held high school qualifications. 54 people (6.2%) earned over $100,000 compared to 12.1% nationally. The employment status of those at least 15 was 408 (47.1%) full-time, 138 (15.9%) part-time, and 18 (2.1%) unemployed.

=== Balcairn statistical area ===
Balcairn, which also includes Amberley Beach and surrounds but does not include Amberley, covers 130.51 km^{2} (50.39 sq mi). It had an estimated population of 2,530 as of June 2025, with a population density of 19.4 people per km^{2}.

Historical population for Balcairn
Year	Pop.	±% p.a.
2006	1,872	—
2013	2,184	+2.23%
2018	2,337	+1.36%
2023	2,490	+1.28%
The 2006 population is for a larger area of 130.58 km^{2}. Source:

Balcairn had a population of 2,490 in the 2023 New Zealand census, an increase of 153 people (6.5%) since the 2018 census, and an increase of 306 people (14.0%) since the 2013 census. There were 1,272 males, 1,212 females, and 6 people of other genders in 1,005 dwellings. 2.9% of people identified as LGBTIQ+. The median age was 49.9 years (compared with 38.1 years nationally). There were 411 people (16.5%) aged under 15 years, 294 (11.8%) aged 15 to 29, 1,242 (49.9%) aged 30 to 64, and 540 (21.7%) aged 65 or older.

People could identify as more than one ethnicity. The results were 94.5% European (Pākehā); 9.9% Māori; 1.6% Pasifika; 1.9% Asian; 0.6% Middle Eastern, Latin American and African New Zealanders (MELAA); and 3.9% other, which includes people giving their ethnicity as "New Zealander". English was spoken by 98.1%, Māori by 1.6%, Samoan by 0.2%, and other languages by 5.5%. No language could be spoken by 1.8% (e.g. too young to talk). New Zealand Sign Language was known by 0.5%. The percentage of people born overseas was 14.8, compared with 28.8% nationally.

Religious affiliations were 27.2% Christian, 0.2% Hindu, 0.1% Islam, 0.4% Māori religious beliefs, 0.1% Buddhist, 1.0% New Age, and 1.4% other religions. People who answered that they had no religion were 59.8%, and 10.0% of people did not answer the census question.

Of those at least 15 years old, 324 (15.6%) people had a bachelor's or higher degree, 1,230 (59.2%) had a post-high school certificate or diploma, and 525 (25.3%) people exclusively held high school qualifications. The median income was $36,000, compared with $41,500 nationally. 159 people (7.6%) earned over $100,000 compared to 12.1% nationally. The employment status of those at least 15 was 1,038 (49.9%) full-time, 351 (16.9%) part-time, and 33 (1.6%) unemployed.

== Education ==
Leithfield School - Te Kura o Kōwai is a co-educational state primary school for Year 1 to 8 students, with a roll of 137 as of July 2026. It opened in 1864.
