= 2012 New Year Honours (New Zealand) =

Annual awards for New Zealanders

- Previous: 2011 New Zealand gallantry awards Next: 2012 Queen's Birthday and Diamond Jubilee Honours
- Type: New Zealand royal honours: Order of New Zealand; New Zealand Order of Merit; Queen's Service Order; Queen's Service Medal; New Zealand Distinguished Service Decoration
- Date: 31 December 2011
- Country: New Zealand
- Total recipients: 171

The 2012 New Year Honours in New Zealand were appointments by Elizabeth II in her right as Queen of New Zealand, on the advice of the New Zealand government, to various orders and honours to reward and highlight good works by New Zealanders, and to celebrate the passing of 2011 and the beginning of 2012. They were announced on 31 December 2011.

The recipients of honours are listed here as they were styled before their new honour.

== Order of New Zealand (ONZ) ==
Ordinary member

- Hone Papita Raukura Hotere – of Dunedin. For services to New Zealand.
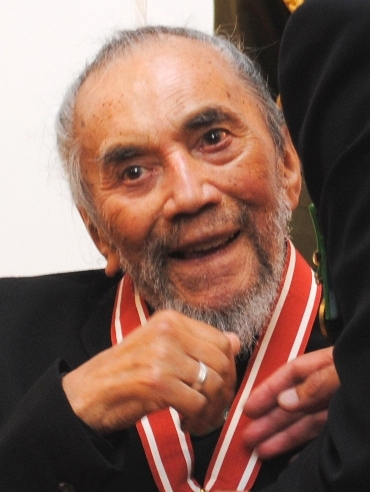
Ralph Hotere

== New Zealand Order of Merit ==
=== Dame Companion (DNZM) ===
- Rosanne Philippa O'Loghlen Meo OBE – of Auckland. For services to business.
- Suzanne Elizabeth Moncrieff ONZM – of Upper Moutere. For services to the arts.
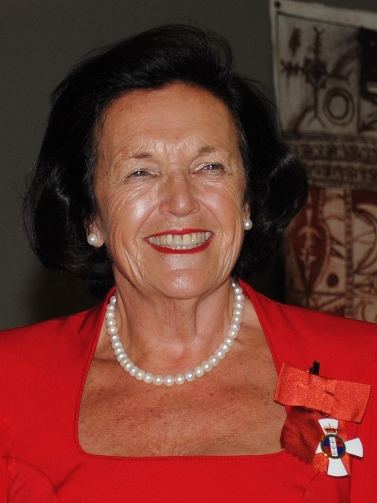
Dame Rosanne Meo

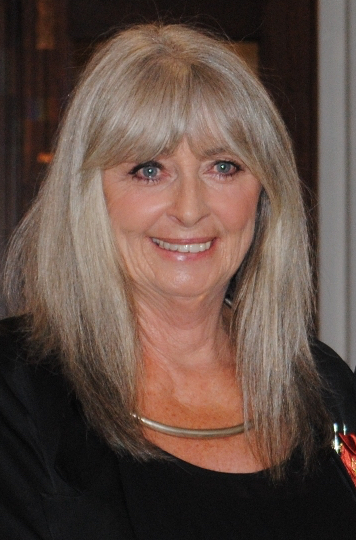
Dame Suzie Moncrieff

=== Knight Companion (KNZM) ===
- Father Desmond John Britten – of Wellington. For services to the community.
- Colin John Giltrap – of Auckland. For services to motorsport and philanthropy.
- Graham William Henry – of Auckland. For services to rugby.
- John Desmond Todd CNZM – of Wellington. For services to business.
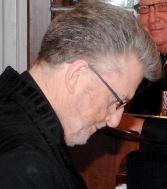
Sir Des Britten

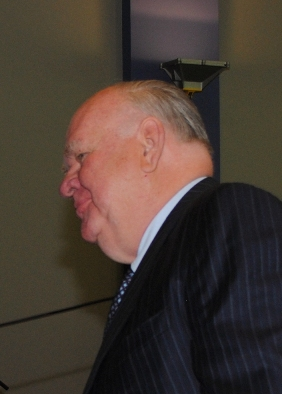
Sir Colin Giltrap

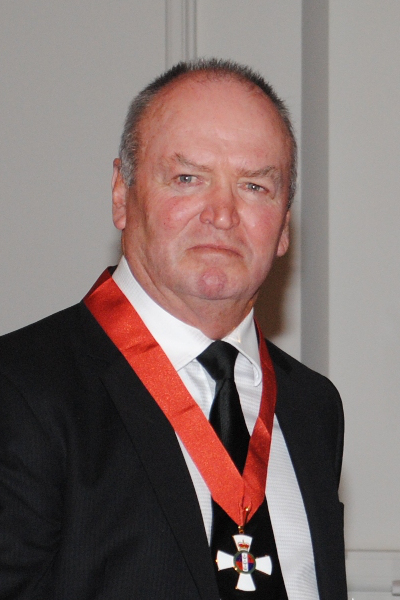
Sir Graham Henry

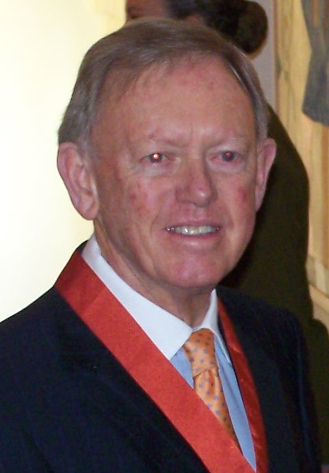
Sir John Todd

=== Companion (CNZM) ===
- Robyn Rangihuia Bargh – of Wellington. For services to the Māori language and publishing.
- Professor Margaret Anne Brimble MNZM – of Auckland. For services to science.
- Malcolm Saba Farry – of Dunedin. For services to the community.
- Diane Foreman – of Auckland. For services to business.
- Dr Osmond Bruce Hadden – of Auckland. For services to ophthalmology.
- Professor Peter Stanley Hughes – of Wellington. For services to the State.
- Richard William Vincent Izard OBE – of Taupō. For services to business and the community.
- Dr James Wharehuia Milroy QSO – of Hamilton. For services to Māori language.
- Martin Colin Snedden – of Wellington. For services to sporting administration.
- Ian Lemuel Taylor – of Dunedin. For services to television and business.
- Dr The Honourable Peter Stuart Watson ONZM – of Washington, D.C., USA. For services to New Zealand–United States relations.
- The Honourable Frances Helen Wilde QSO JP – of Wellington. For services to local-body affairs and the community.
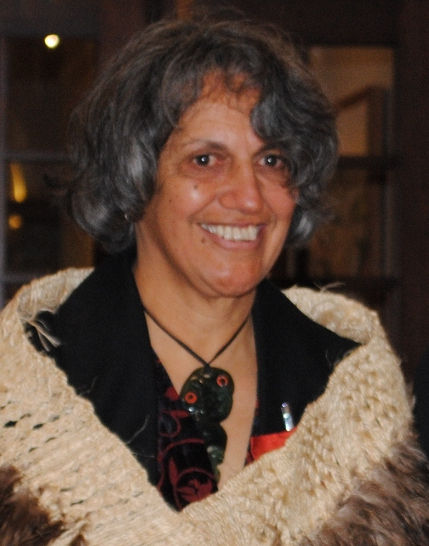
Robyn Bargh

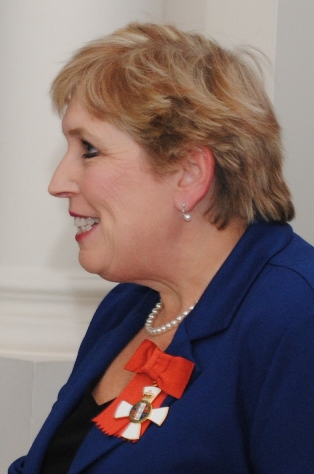
Margaret Brimble

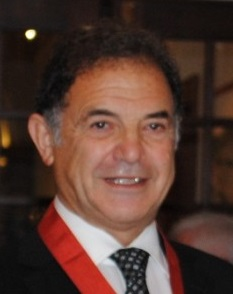
Malcolm Farry

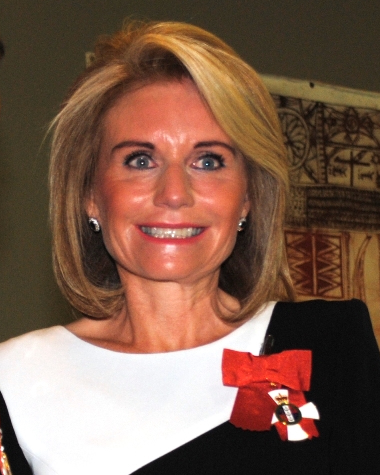
Diane Foreman

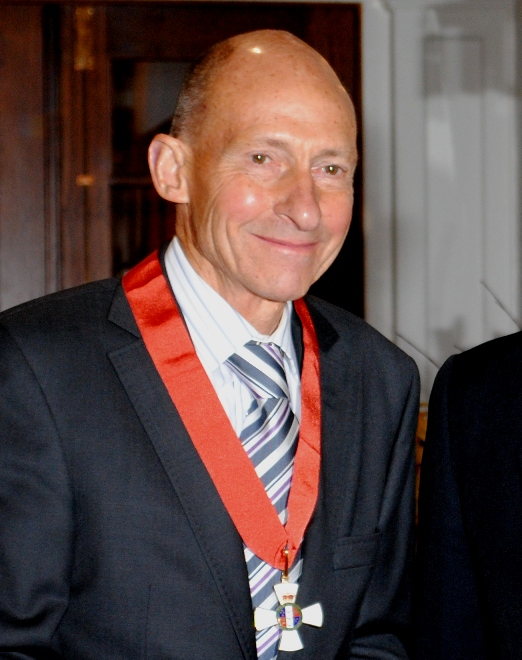
Bruce Hadden

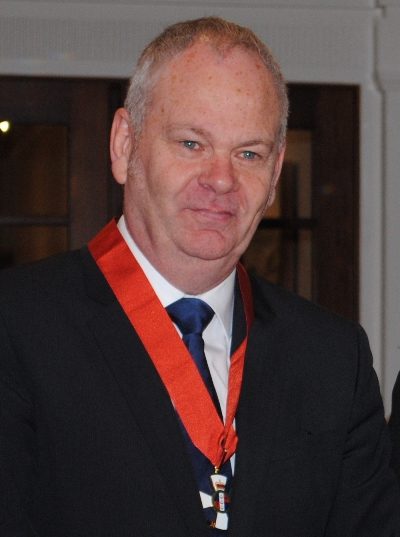
Peter Hughes

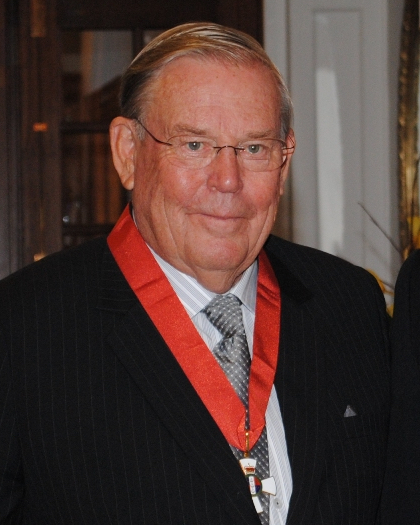
Richard Izard

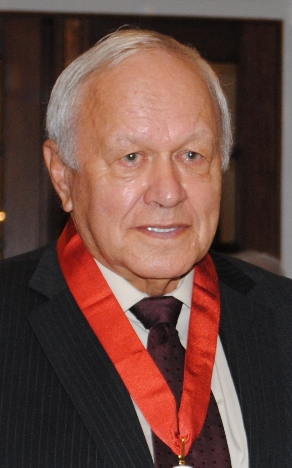
Te Wharehuia Milroy

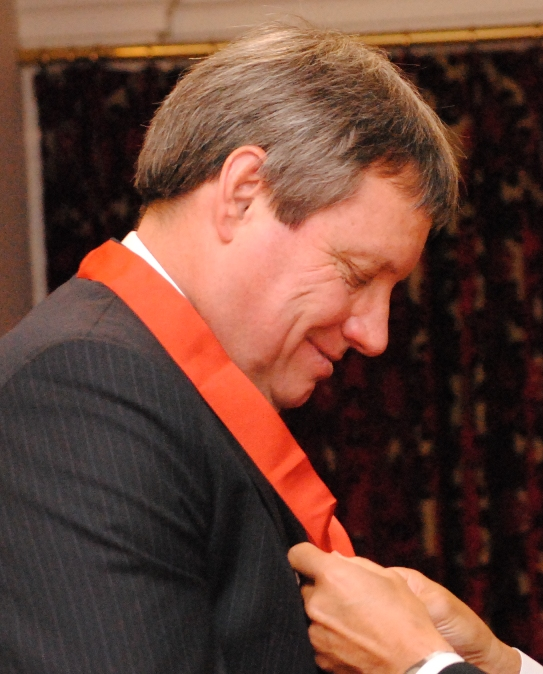
Martin Snedden

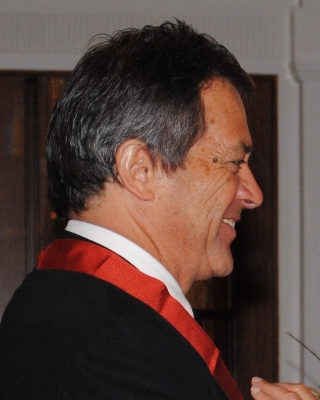
Ian Taylor

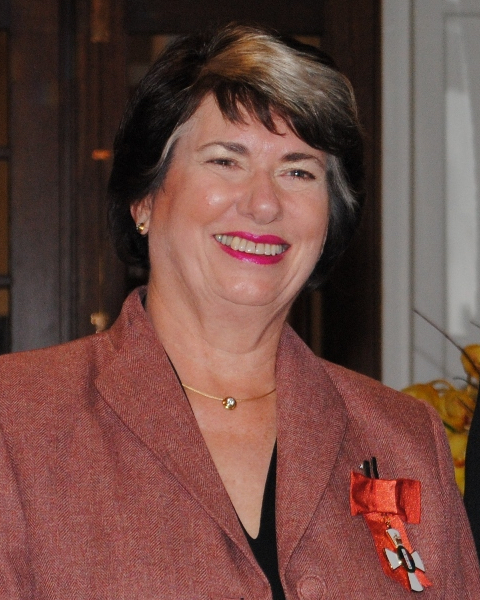
Fran Wilde

=== Officer (ONZM) ===
- Uluomatootua Saulaulu Aiono – of Auckland. For services to business.
- Professor Anthony Hewton Angelo – of Wellington. For services to legal education.
- Professor Michael Warne Ardagh – of Christchurch. For services to emergency medicine.
- Carol May Becker – of Ahaura. For services to Plunket.
- Paul Caffyn – of Runanga. For services to sea kayaking and water safety.
- Grace Dorina Thearesa Dorset – of Rotorua. For services to Māori.
- Edward Byron Evans MNZM JP – of Warkworth. For services to the community.
- Russell Talbot Feist – of Waikanae. For services to Māori.
- Eseta Fifita Finau – of Auckland. For services to health and the Pacific community.
- Dr Arie Geursen – of Auckland. For services to science.
- Wendy Faye Hawkings QSM JP – of Warkworth. For services to health.
- John Revell Hynds – of Auckland. For services to business and philanthropy.
- Dr Alan Ross Jamieson – of Auckland. For services to radio spectrum management.
- Christopher Patrick Kenny – of Porirua. For services to boxing.
- Professor David Stephen Lamb – of Wellington. For services to health.
- Ian Robert MacRae – of Napier. For services to rugby.
- Barry John Maister – of Lower Hutt. For services to sport.
- Dr Donald Lindsay Mathieson QC – of Waikanae. For services to the law and legal education.
- Sylvia Margarite Piera McArthur – of Wellington. For services to the arts.
- Dr Ron Laurence McDowall – of Auckland. For services to science.
- Rear Admiral Anthony Jonathan Parr MVO – of Wellington. For services to the State.
- Peter Joseph Radich – of Blenheim. For services to the law.
- Richard Alan Waddel – of Auckland. For services to corporate governance.
- Emeritus Professor Peter Gerard Walls – of Wellington. For services to music.
- James Harold Young – of Auckland. For services to boat building.

Honorary

- Constance Ellen Lawn – of Virginia, USA. For services to New Zealand–United States relations.
- The Honourable Clayton Keith Yeutter – of Maryland, USA. For services to New Zealand–United States relations.
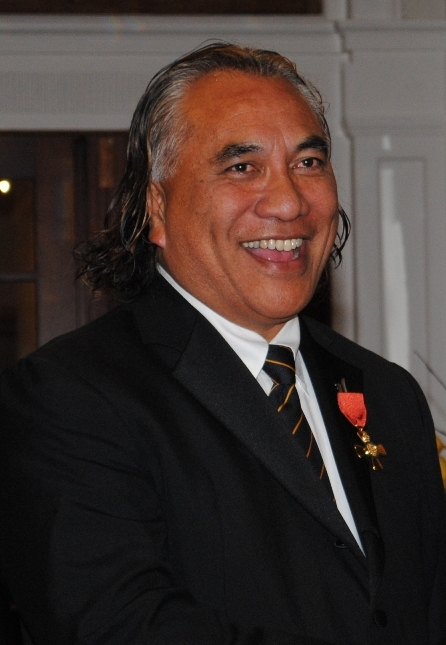
Ulu Aiono

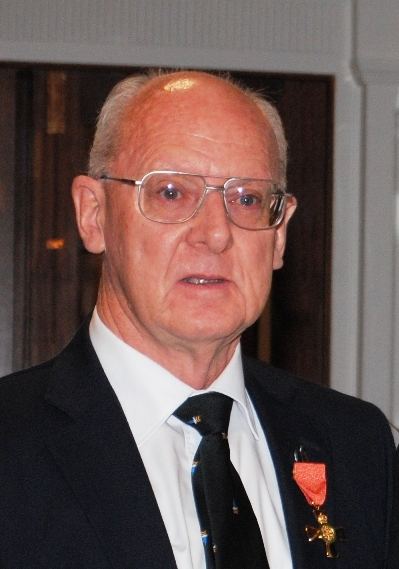
Tony Angelo

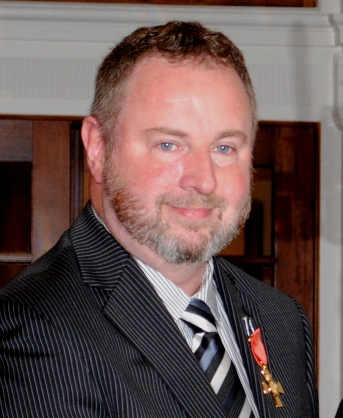
Mike Ardagh

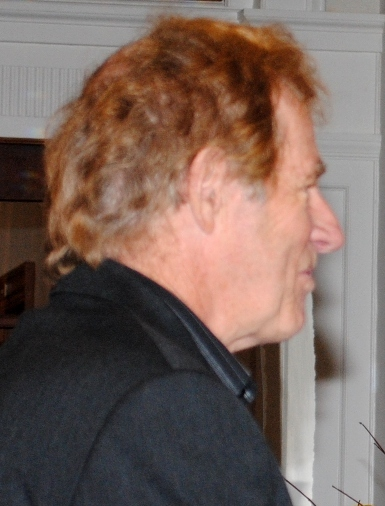
Paul Caffyn

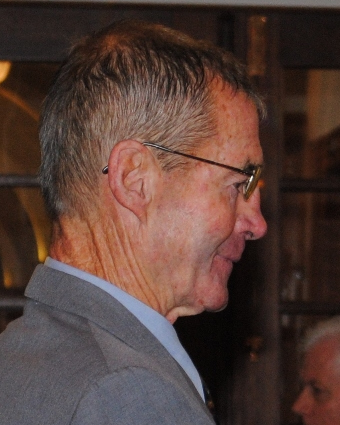
Chris Kenny

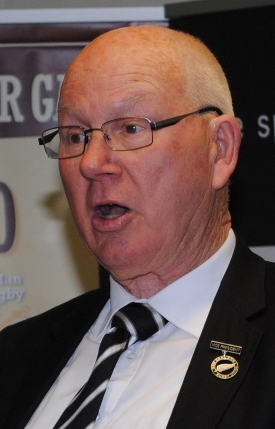
Ian MacRae

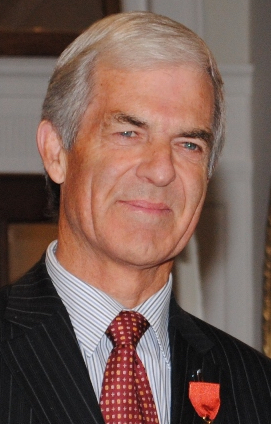
Barry Maister

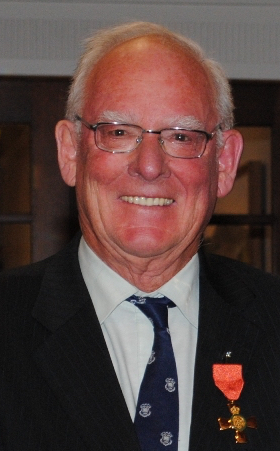
Don Mathieson

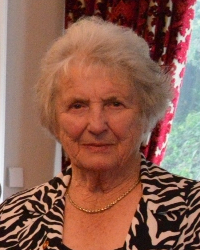
Piera McArthur

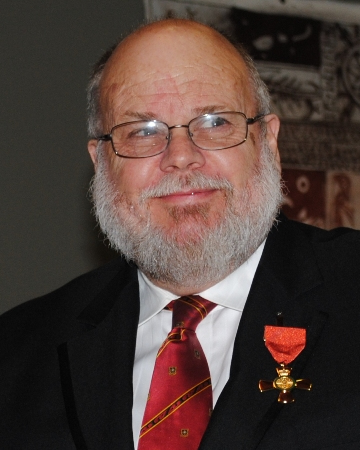
Ron McDowall

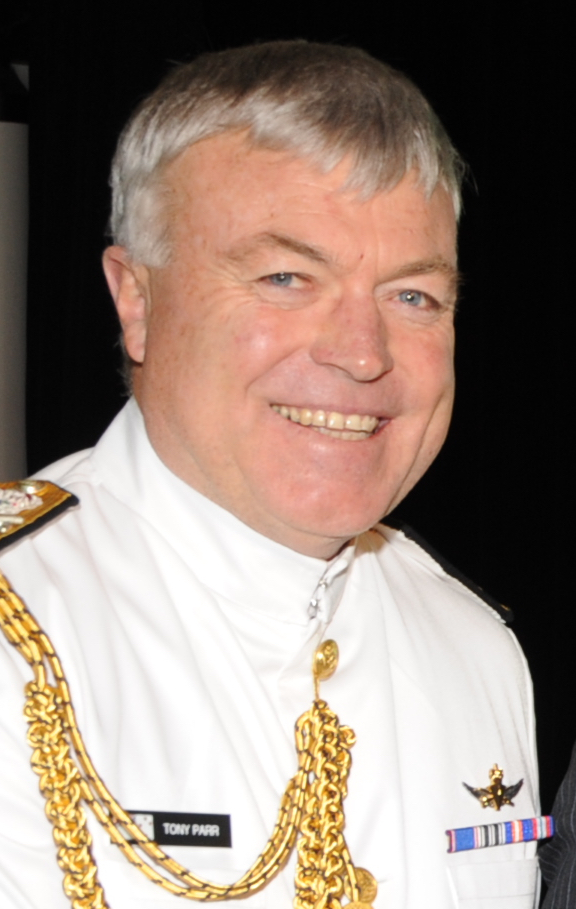
Tony Parr

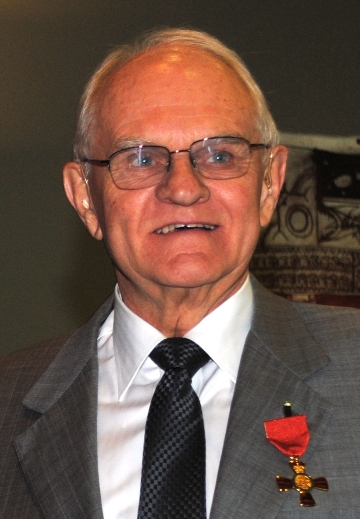
Richard Waddel

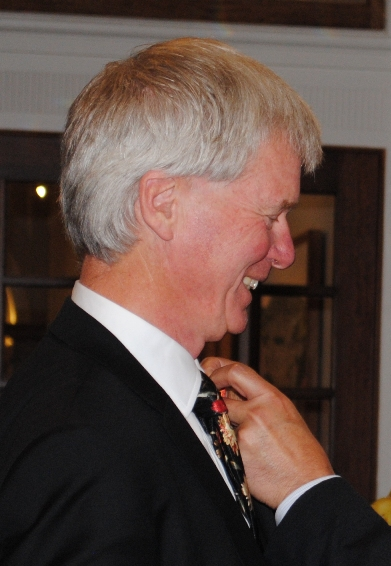
Peter Walls

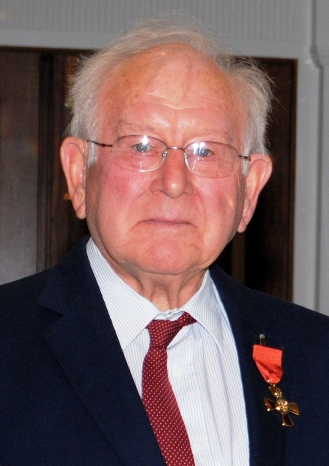
Jim Young

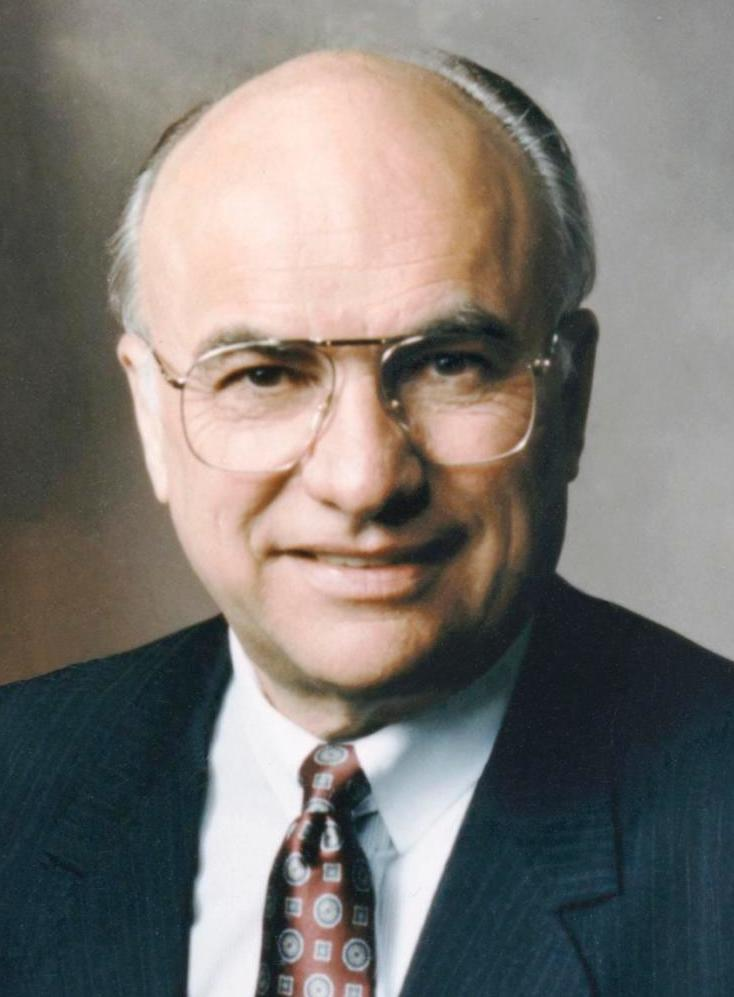
Clay Yeutter

=== Member (MNZM) ===
- John Duncan Anderson – of Warkworth. For services to tourism.
- Dr John Hall Angus – of Cromwell. For services to the State.
- Piatarihi Ngaku Beatrice Callaghan – of Te Puke. For services to Māori.
- Cheryl Leigh Cameron – of Porirua. For services to film.
- Helen Margaret Campbell-O'Brien QSM – of Invercargill. For services to literacy.
- Dr Timothy Kenred Carey-Smith – of Dunedin. For services to palliative care.
- Dr John Scott Carnachan – of Auckland. For services to medicine and the community.
- Mary Bernadette Chamberlain – of Auckland. For services to education.
- Jeremy Ormond Cooper – of Auckland. For services to medicine.
- David John Craven – of Palmerston North. For services to hockey administration.
- Dr Sabine Rosemarie Fenton – of Auckland. For services to translation and interpreting.
- Roger Allan Gascoigne – of Porirua. For services to the media.
- Tim Caspar Haiselden – of Wellington. For services to acupuncture.
- Anthony Grant Herlihy – of Papakura. For services to harness racing.
- Associate Professor Annette Diana Huntington – of Wellington. For services to nursing research.
- David Oliver Jones – of Auckland. For services to business and the economy.
- Margaret Anne Kawharu – of Waimauku. For services to Māori.
- Associate Professor Merata Kawharu – of Dunedin. For services to Māori education.
- Graeme Frank Kendall – of Auckland. For services to sailing and philanthropy.
- Yong Wook Kim – of Auckland. For services to the Asian community and business.
- Lua Kava Lepaio JP – of Porirua. For services to the Tokelauan community.
- Brendan Jon Lindsay – of Auckland. For services to business.
- Bert Johnson Mackie JP – of Wellington. For services to Māori.
- John Niko Maihi – of Whanganui. For services to Māori.
- Verna Mary McFelin – of Christchurch. For services to the community.
- Brian John McGuinness – of Wellington. For services to the building industry.
- Kirsty Alsoon Murrell-McMillan – of Invercargill. For services to nursing.
- William Leggett Noble – of Hamilton. For services to education.
- Hinerangi Ada Raumati – of Auckland. For services to business and Māori.
- Timothy Scott Richardson – of Tauranga. For services to rowing.
- Dr John Stuart Simpson – of Wellington. For services to medicine.
- Terry Smith – of Danbury, United Kingdom. For services to New Zealand–United Kingdom relations.
- Sydney Maxwell John Smith QSM JP – of Amberley. For services to rowing.
- Pio Keith Terei – of Auckland. For services to entertainment.
- Philip Wayne Wareing – of Methven. For services to the community.
- Paul Douglas Woodgate – of Christchurch, for services to transport.
- Howard Stanley Wright – of New Plymouth. For services to manufacturing.
- Beatrice Tui Louise Yates QSM JP – of Rotorua. For services to the community.

Honorary

- Ali Partal – of Çanakkale, Turkey. For services to New Zealand–Turkey relations.
- Ryu Yano – of Tokyo, Japan. For services to New Zealand–Japan relations.
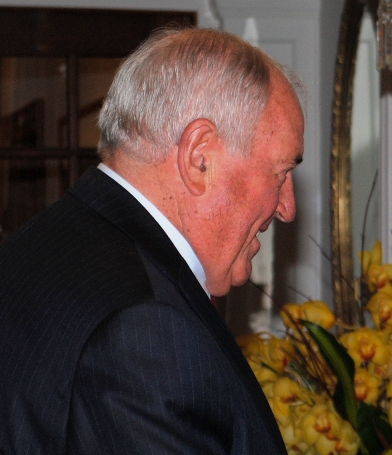
John Anderson

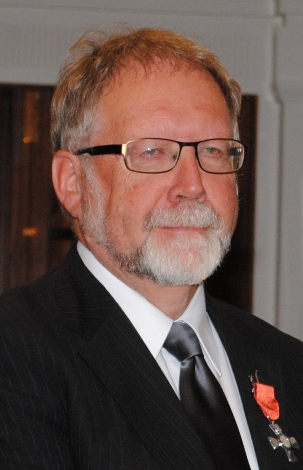
John Angus

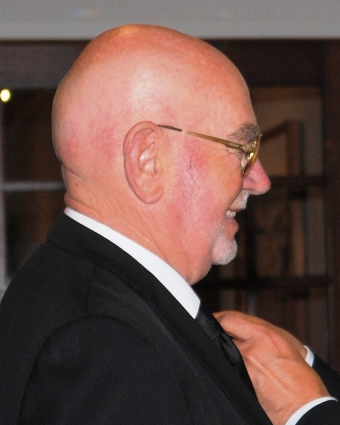
David Craven

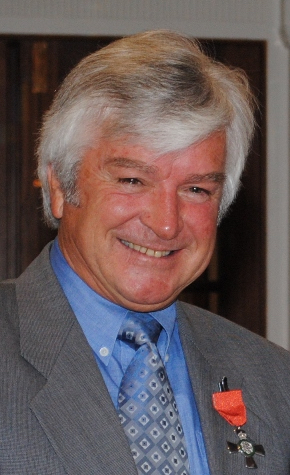
Roger Gascoigne

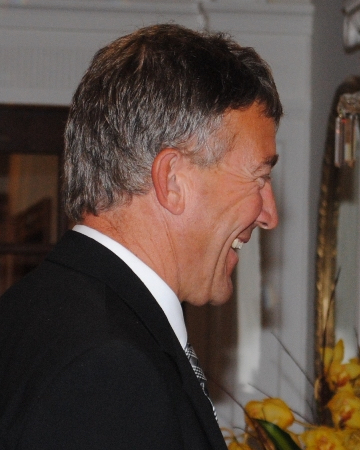
Tony Herlihy

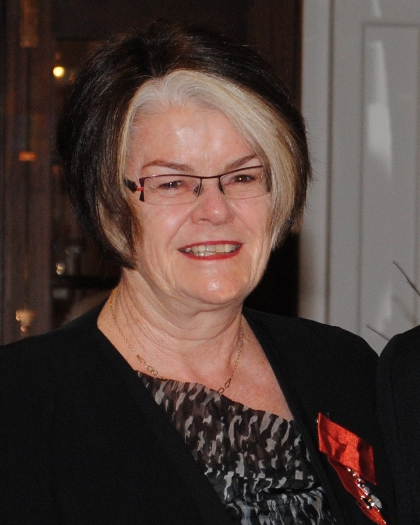
Annette Huntington

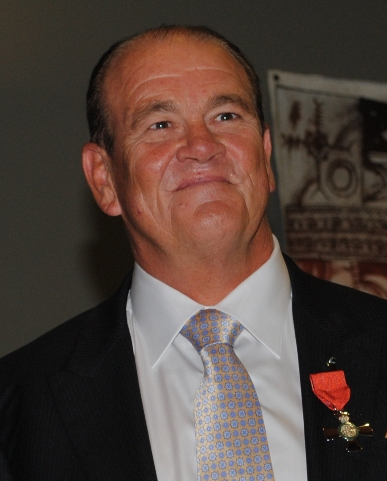
Brendan Lindsay

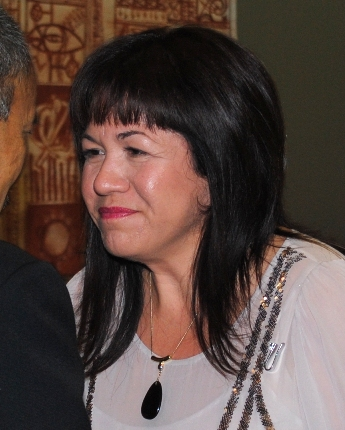
Hinerangi Raumati

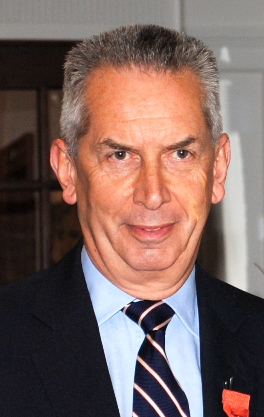
Terry Smith

== Companion of the Queen's Service Order (QSO) ==
- Judge Paul Franklin Barber – of Wellington. For services to the State.
- Dr Angus Campbell David Bayvel – of Waikanae. For services to the State.
- The Honourable John McGregor Carter – of Rarotonga. For services as a member of parliament.
- The Honourable Harry James Duynhoven JP – of New Plymouth. For services as a member of parliament.
- Garry Leslie Evans – of Wellington. For services to the State.
- Michael James Hall – of Te Horo. For services to the State.
- Dr Andrew Ian McKenzie – of Greytown. For services to the State.
- Stephen McKernan – of Auckland. For services to the State.
- Karen Margaret Sewell – of Wellington. For services to the State.
- John Plested Tristram – of Lower Hutt. For services to Land Search and Rescue.
- Dr David Stuart Wratt – of Wellington. For services to science.
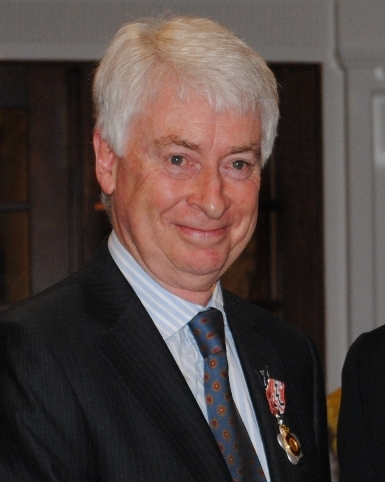
Paul Barber

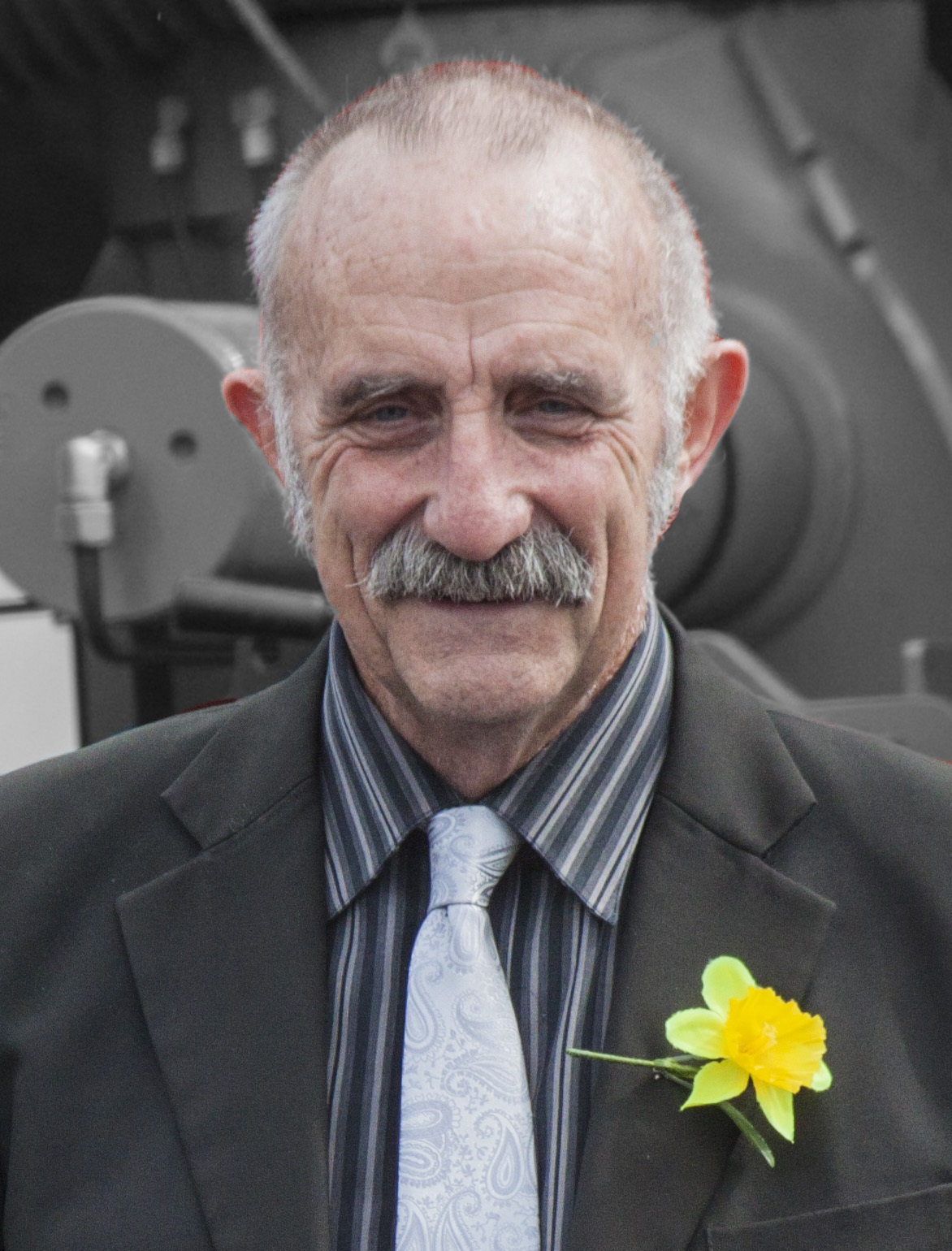
John Carter

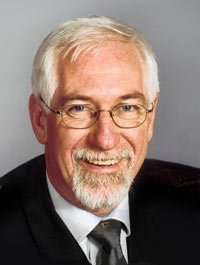
Harry Duynhoven

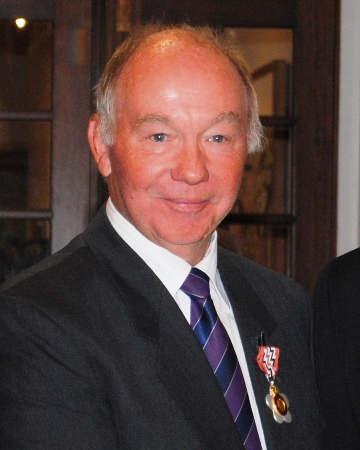
Mike Hall

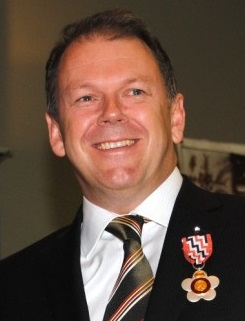
Stephen McKernan

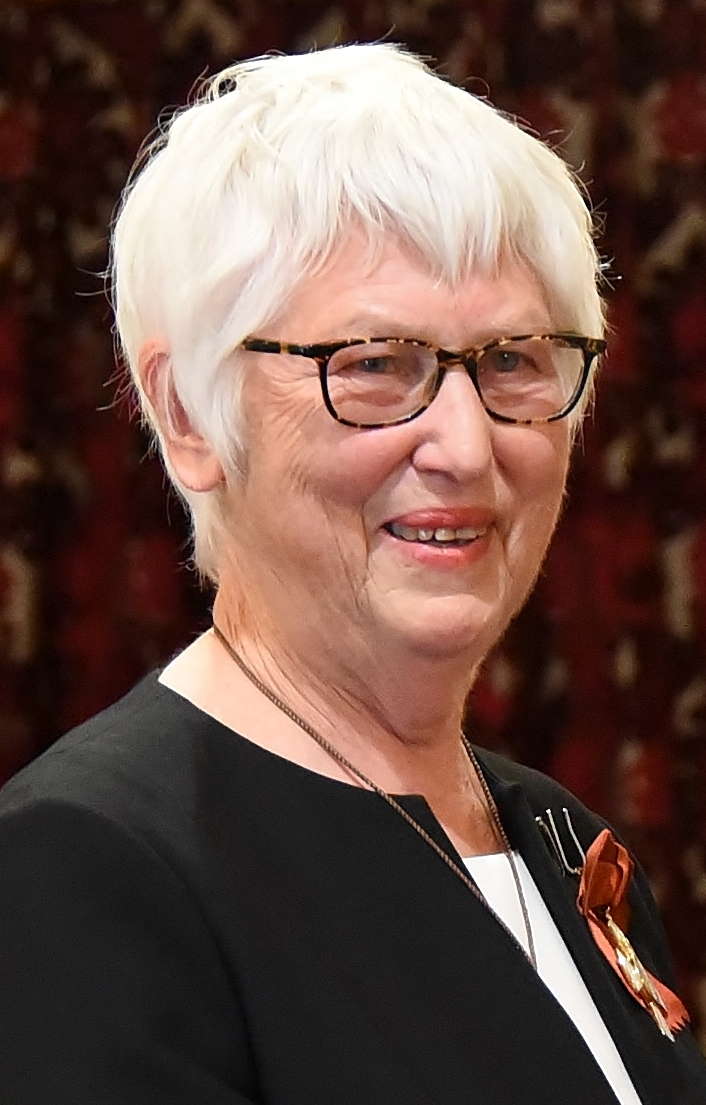
Karen Sewell

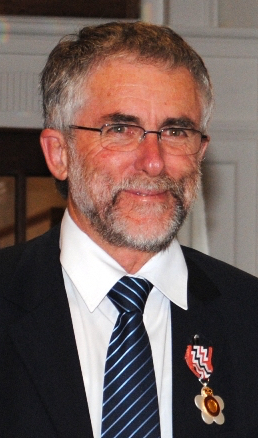
David Wratt

== Queen's Service Medal (QSM) ==
- Brian Leslie Aldridge – of Christchurch. For services to cricket administration.
- Dr Ralph Bradley Allen – of Dunedin. For services to conservation.
- Howard Stewart Anderson – of Pātea. For services to the community.
- William Arnott Arcus JP – of Wellington. For services to the community.
- Margaret Ann Armour – of Porirua. For services to the community.
- George Arulanantham JP – of Auckland. For services to the Tamil community.
- Metuakore Bates-Faasisila – of Auckland. For services to the Cook Islands community.
- Trevor Alan Beaton – of Christchurch. For services to education.
- Pieter Braun – of Tūrangi. For services to education.
- Gaynor Margaret Brown – of Auckland. For services to education.
- Gregory Craig Brownless – of Tauranga. For services to the community.
- Raymond Clarence Bushell – of Te Puke. For services to wetland conservation.
- Laurence John Byers JP – of Kaikohe. For services to local-body affairs and the community.
- Chief Fire Officer Rodney John Caldow – of Foxton Beach. For services to the New Zealand Fire Service.
- Christopher Bryan George Carson – of Upper Hutt. For services to the State.
- Robert Raymond Cater – of Porirua. For services to the community.
- Audrey Bing Shum Chan – of Auckland. For services to the community.
- Haami Tutu Chapman – of Auckland. For services to Māori.
- Kitty Shui Fung Chiu JP – of Auckland. For services to the community.
- Brian Anthony Coulter – of Wellington. For services to rugby.
- Ronald Walter Craddock – of Auckland. For services to the Manukau Volunteer Coastguard.
- Phillip Ngawhira Crown – of Te Kūiti. For services to Māori.
- David Alfred Culham – of Whangārei. For services to business and the community.
- Clare Averil Derby – of Upper Hutt. For services to music.
- Ross Andrew Ditmer – of Rangiora. For services to the New Zealand Fire Service.
- Vera Ellen RRC JP – of Lower Hutt. For services to the community.
- Paul Leslie Ferris – of Glenorchy. For services to education.
- Anne Uma Devi George – of Auckland. For services to the community.
- Janet Dorothy Gow – of Auckland. For services to genealogical research.
- Hugh Green – of Auckland. For services to philanthropy.
- Simon George Gundry – of Auckland. For services to the community.
- Michael Hannaway – of Wellington. For services to architectural conservation.
- Helen Kathleen Hay – of Wellington. For services to the community.
- David Samuel Howan – of Wellington. For services to brass bands.
- Dr Nicolaas Cornelis Lambrechtsen – of Wellington. For services to the Indonesian community.
- John Walter Linton – of Te Puke. For services to the community.
- Arthur Loo – of Auckland. For services to the Chinese community.
- Margaret Hazel Barcham MacMillan – of Ōkaihau. For services to the community.
- Neil MacMillan – of Ōkaihau. For services to the community.
- Dr Selwyn Gerald Maister – of Christchurch. For services to hockey.
- Kerrin Rhyl Marshall – of Napier. For services to pipe bands.
- Craig Govan McGregor – of Christchurch. For services to education.
- Kay Jennifer McIntyre – of Auckland. For services to netball.
- Winnifred Elizabeth McLelland JP – of Dunedin. For services to the Pacific community.
- Elizabeth Ann Mills – of Auckland. For services to children.
- Graeme Ernest Mudge – of Gisborne. For services to the arts.
- Alan Roderick Munro – of Timaru. For services to the community.
- Struan James Bennet Munro JP – of Kurow. For services to local-body affairs and the community.
- Victor McKenzie Munro – of Ōhope. For services to the community.
- Henry Frederick Ngapo – of Whanganui. For services to education.
- Christine Yvonne Orchard – of Auckland. For services to medicine.
- Kanubhai Patel – of Auckland. For services to the Indian community.
- Sharon Payne – of Hastings. For services to nursing.
- Tuihana Pook – of Ōpōtiki. For services to Māori education and the community.
- Richard Riki Rakena – of Thames. For services to Māori and the community.
- Katherina Ixia Rean JP – of Auckland. For services to the community.
- Walter John Rofe – of Wairoa. For services to conservation and angling.
- Jean Louisa Rutherford – of Woodend. For services to the community.
- Moengaroa Rosalima Solomon JP – of Ngāruawāhia. For services to Māori and the community.
- Gladys Grace Stephens JP – of Hamilton. For services to the Filipino community.
- Marette June Taylor – of Christchurch. For services to the community.
- Millie Amiria Te Kaawa – of Whakatāne. For services to Māori and the Presbyterian Church.
- Robert Joseph Ting – of Wellington. For services to the Chinese community.
- John Charles Towns JP – of Nelson. For services to the community.
- Pati Peni Umaga – of Lower Hutt. For services to the Pacific community.
- Thomas James Edmond Vernon – of Taihape. For services to the New Zealand Fire Service.
- Margaret Wensley Willcox – of Auckland. For services to literature.
- Margaret Lorraine Wilson – of Putāruru. For services to animal welfare.
- Seung-Jae Yu – of Auckland. For services to the Korean community.
- Jung Mi Yu – of Hamilton. For services to the Korean community.
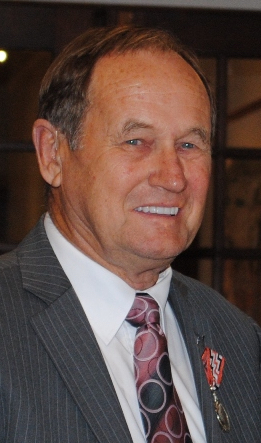
Brian Aldridge

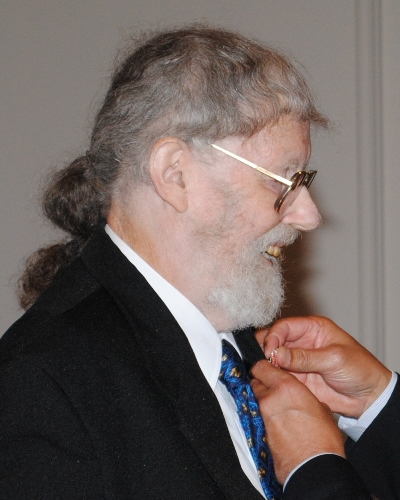
Howard Anderson

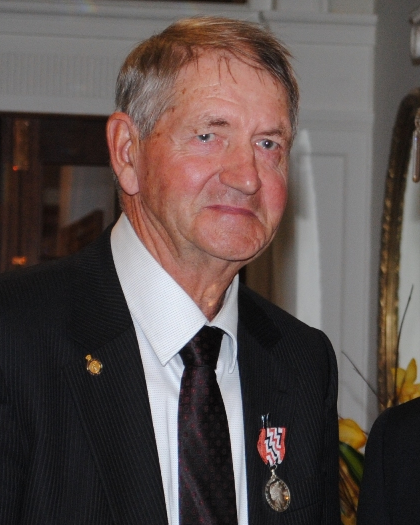
Laurie Byers

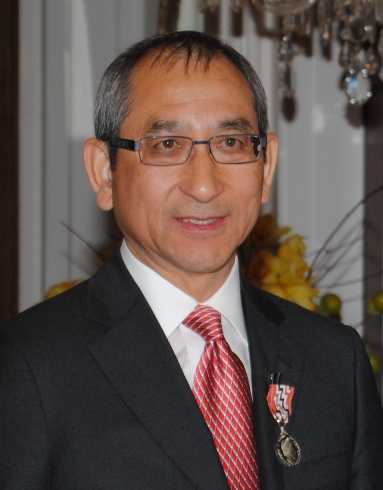
Arthur Loo

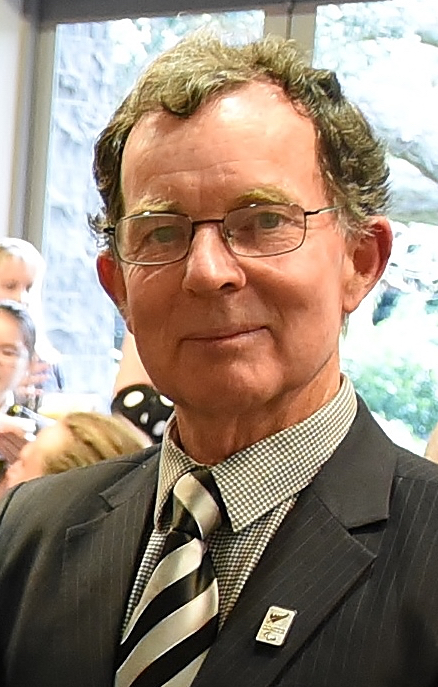
Selwyn Maister

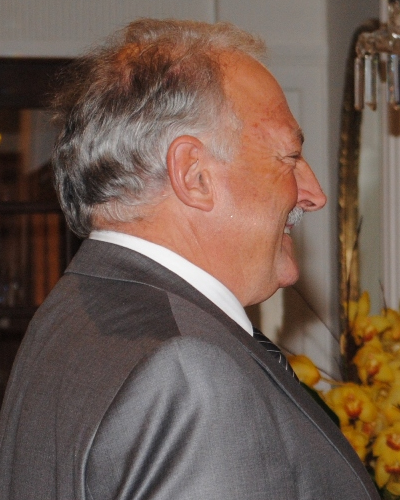
Craig McGregor

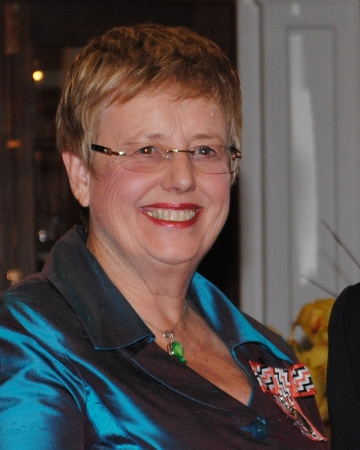
Kay McIntyre

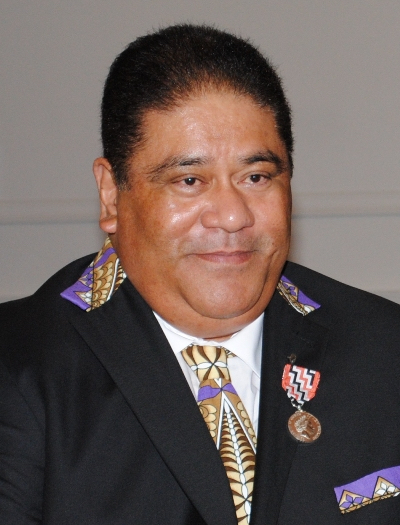
Pati Umaga

== New Zealand Distinguished Service Decoration (DSD) ==
- Squadron Leader Keith Murray Bartlett – Royal New Zealand Air Force.
- Colonel John Raymond Boswell – New Zealand Army.
- Lieutenant Commander Simon Campbell Griffiths – Royal New Zealand Navy.
- Squadron Leader Russell Mostyn Kennedy – Royal New Zealand Air Force.
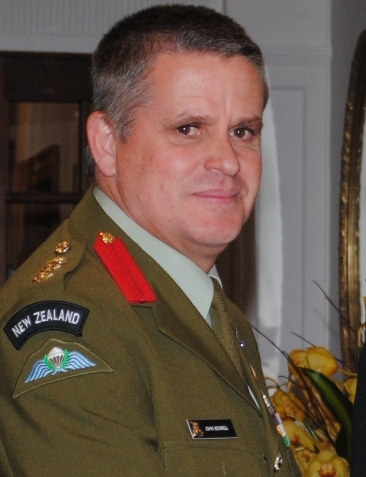
John Boswell
