= Little Kowai River =

Coordinates: 43°19′S 171°56′E

Location
- Country: New Zealand

Physical characteristics
- Source
  - location: Torlesse Range
- Mouth
  - location: Kowai River
- Length: 15 km (9.3 mi)

The Little Kowai River is a river of the Canterbury region of New Zealand's South Island. It flows generally south from the Torlesse Range to join with the Kowai River two kilometres north of Springfield.

== See also ==
- List of rivers of New Zealand
