= Ulu Aiono =

Samoan-New Zealand entrepreneur

Uluomato'otua Aiono
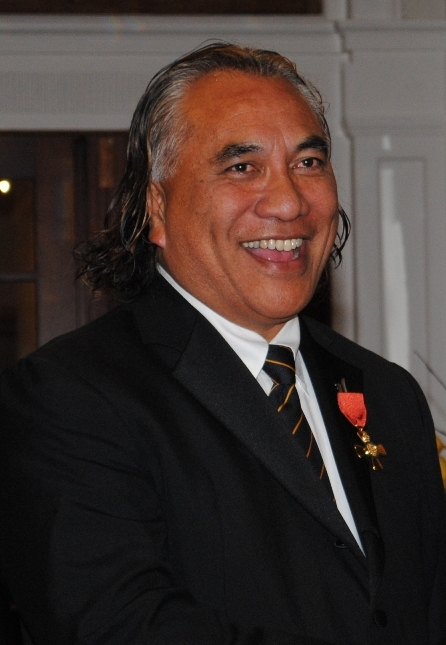
- Aiono in 2012
- Born: Uluomato'otua Saulaulu Aiono; Apia, Samoa
- Other names: Ulu Aiono; Uluomatootua Aiono
- Citizenship: New Zealand; Samoa
- Education: Auckland Grammar School, University of Otago
- Occupation: Entrepreneur
- Organization(s): Habitat for Humanity; The Cause Collective NZ; The RiseUp Trust
- Known for: Founder of Cogita First Pacific Islander to complete an MBA First Pacific Islander with a Bachelor of Computer Science
- Spouse: Margaret Aiono (nee Gavin Brown)
- Children: 1
- Honours: Officer of the New Zealand order of Merit (2012)

Uluomato'otua ("Ulu") Saulaulu Aiono ONZM (born 1954) is a Samoan-born New Zealand technology entrepreneur, civic leader, and philanthropist. He is currently involved in social housing through Habitat for Humanity and the Salvation Army. In 1983, after completing his Bachelor of Computer Science degree at the University of Otago, Aiono founded the enterprise resource planning software company Cogita. In 2012, he and his wife, Margaret Brown, sold Cogita to Silicon Valley company Epicor.

== Early life and education ==
Ulu Aiono was born in 1954 to a Christian family in Apia, Samoa. His mother was the daughter of the paramount chief of Apia. His father came from a less privileged background, but went on to become the chief interpreter for the Supreme Court of Samoa.

In 1960, Aiono immigrated to New Zealand with his parents and siblings. In 1963, they moved into the Otara housing estate in Epsom, where he attended Auckland Grammar School. His mother struggled to adapt to New Zealand initially; his father became a freezing worker. The Aiono family across from the Alexandra Park racecourse, where Ulu and his brother collected Coca-Cola and Fanta bottles to earn money.

In 1979, Aiono enrolled in the University of Otago, where he received his Bachelor of Science in 1981. In 1984, he returned to university to complete his Master of Business Administration (MBA), Finance and Information Systems at Otago. Aiono was New Zealand’s first Pacific Islander with a Bachelor of Computer Science and also the first Pacific Islander to complete an MBA.

== Business career ==
Aiono founded Cogita in 1983 while working full time, shortly after receiving his bachelor's degree in computer science. Cogita was a company providing enterprise resource planning (ERP) software to blue-chip manufacturing and distribution companies, operating in New Zealand and Australia. By 2008, the company was known as a major channel provider of Epicor software in New Zealand. By 2012, it was the top reseller of Epicor in the world, with 60 employees and annual revenue in the tens of millions. In May 2012, Aiono and Margaret Brown, executive director of Cogita, sold their business to Epicor.

== Career as civic leader ==
In October 2005, Ulu was a forum member of the Auckland Regional Economic Development Forum which was responsible for the stewardship of the ongoing implementation of the ARED Strategy and the Metro Project Action Plan. The ARED Strategy set a vision and directions for the economic and social well-being of all Aucklanders. The Metro Project Action Plan was developed subsequently to enable the implementation of the Strategy. The forum was replaced by new departments within the Auckland Council after the inaugural super-city elections on 9 October 2010 and this is when Ulu ceased his time here.

While being a forum member, Ulu was also a University Council Member at Auckland University of Technology from 2002 to 2010. During this time, the New Zealand Governor General (1985–1990) Sir Paul Reeves was the chancellor and also Ulu's governance teacher and coach.

During November 2008, Ulu joined the People's Centre Trust (TPCT) Board and later became the Chairman in 2010. TPCT was a primary health organisation (PHO) providing medical and dental services to over 8,000 patients located in Central Auckland, Mangere and Manurewa. Most of the patients were Māori, Pacific Islanders, new immigrants and refugees.

Ulu was appointed Chairman of National Pacific Radio Trust on 1 October 2010. NPRT was established in May 2002 to direct government funded projects such as various campaigns which promoted anti-family violence and awareness for rheumatic fever and chronic illness. Ulu would continue his role as Chairman into 2011 as appointed by Hon Jonathan Coleman, Minister of Broadcasting and again in 2013 as appointed by Hon Craig Foss. After seven years, Ulu would retire from his role as Chairman of National Pacific Radio Trust on 31 July 2017 after usurping a role as council member at the Manukau Institute of Technology.

In 2012, Ulu became the Deputy Chairman at Alliance Health Plus which is another primary health organisation (PHO) which operates to fund, support and develop approximately 13 medical practices in the Auckland super-city region of New Zealand.

In May 2014, Ulu stepped into the shoes of Director on the board of Habitat for Humanity New Zealand Ltd, a limited, charitable, company which serves all of New Zealand's Habitat for Humanity affiliates. Ulu stepped down from this role in December 2016 where he was preceded by Michael McLean, a fellow board member of his.

Ulu was ministerially appointed as a board member of the Pacific Business Trust by the New Zealand government in July 2014. In this role, he considered social and economic factors which contributed to the under-employment of Pacific Islanders in New Zealand and what was needed to fix this. Ulu's answer was to create entrepreneurs. In September 2015, Ulu would step down from his role as board member from the Pacific Business Trust.

In March 2014, Ulu co-opted onto the board of decile 1, co-ed secondary school, Otahuhu College alongside a friend from his church, Salvation Army Otahuhu Crops. Ulu would be elected by parents as Vice Chairman/Chairman of Finance and Property Committee. He would retire from all roles associated with the school in December 2016.

== Manukau Institute of Technology and charity boards ==
On 12 June 2017, Hon Paul Goldsmith would appoint Ulu as council member at the Manukau Institute of Technology and as an alumnus of Auckland University of Technology Council, he learned a lot about the tertiary education sector that he'd implement in this role. In this role, Ulu claimed "If Aotearoa NZ's tertiary education leaders do not develop radical, effective, methods of drastically cutting the lead time to produce skilled people...then Kiwis will have to get used to being foreigners in their own country."

In 2010, Ulu became Chairman of Cloud Region Limited, an entrepreneurial company under the COGITA group that provided computing services to New Zealand's primary health sector and the global online travel bookings industry. Cloud Region Ltd ceased trading in 2012 as it was acquired by 2Onions Ltd, but Ulu still remains Chairman.

Since February 2017, Ulu has been the Treasurer of the RiseUp Trust. What started out as a home-schooling programme in the garage of its founder, Sita Selupe, grew into an initiative that connects Māori and Pacific families to a three-way learning process, where Whanau Educators take parents and their children through real-life, problem-solving strategies in order to reach higher academic achievement and greater engagement in their children’s education. RiseUp values connecting children with their parents and stresses the importance of knowing your roots. The trust opened The Rise Up Academy, a charter school in Mangere, in 2014. The Rise UP Academy transitioned to a Designated Character School in 2019. Ulu remains as Deputy Chairman and Treasurer.

On 1 September 2017, one of New Zealand's newest biotech companies, SensorFlo, was introduced into the industry with Ulu as Chairman and Seed Capital Funding First Investor. On 21 January 2018, SensorFlo received ethics approval for their first clinical trial and would later seek FDA certification. Progress was made when Callaghan Innovation approved a research and development grant for SensorFlo which enabled experimental designs on non-invasive blood glucose measurement. SensorFlo would later receive notice of allowance granting noninvasive blood glucose patent from the US Patent Office, which lasts 20 years, in 2020 and a European Patent granted in June 2021 after a second clinical trial ethics application was approved. Ulu remains actives in this role at SensorFlo but is now also Director as of 2019.

Since 2016, Ulu has been the chairman of The Cause Collective NZ. Established in August 2010, The Cause Collective is a Pacific social change organisation working out of South Auckland that focuses on the causes of social problems facing communities most in need to see what obstacles prevent them from thriving. In January 2022, Ulu began building a team for the development of a new product and work begun through Aqil Abbas in the Netherlands. In October 2022, the team released a limited prototype to a cohort of 500 people. In December 2022, Ulu integrated The Cause Collective and Alliance Health Plus. He said, "The combination and integration of our two organisations’ collective skills and experience will make us more effective in identifying the bottlenecks and constraint in the full inventory of determinants for health and wellbeing. Only then can any organisation improve prevention, reduce inequity and inequality in health, and cause people in our communities to live longer, healthier, quality lives."

On Tuesday 21 March 2023, The Cause Collective started a new programme, Get Ready, Work Ready, which aims to equip Pacific youth in Auckland with employment skills to the enter the workforce or into further training.

== Personal life ==
Ulu was raised Christian and is still man of faith today. He credits his faith in his success and believes recognition for his journey is not only his own but rather shared. In a 2011 interview with Vaimoana Tapaleao, Ulu declares:

"I am a product of Christian parents, so I am thankful to God and them. I am also indebted to my wife Margaret and family. Without them I would be nowhere."

Ulu married Margaret Gavin Brown in the late 1970s and they had a son in 1998, Loligi Alexander Saluafata Aiono, who was named after his maternal great-grandfather.

On Saturday 5 April 2018, Ulu's brother, Punipuniolo Mulinu'u Aiono passed away in Middlemore Hospital. The funeral was held at 10am on Wednesday 9 May at the Otahuhu Salvation Army Corps.

== Awards and accolades ==
- Ulu became an Officer of the New Zealand Order of Merit for services to business in the 2012 New Year Honours.
- In 2015, Ulu won the Pacific Business Trust Pacific Enterprise Award winner at the SunPix Pacific Peoples Awards.
- In 2022, Ulu was inducted into the New Zealand business hall of fame alongside Graeme Hart, New Zealand's richest man.
- In 2023, Ulu won an Auckland Grammar School "Augusta Award", which is given to Old Boys who are at the top of their respective industries or specialties, or who have demonstrated a remarkable contribution to the fields of Arts, Business, Sport and/or Public Service.
- In May 2025 Ulu was Awarded an Honorary Doctorate for commerce at University of Otago.
