= Connie Lawn =

American journalist

Connie Lawn ONZM
- Born: Constance Ellen Lawn; May 14, 1944; Long Branch, New Jersey, U.S.
- Died: April 2, 2018 (aged 73); Falls Church, Virginia, U.S.
- Occupations: Radio journalist, member of the White House press corps
- Years active: 1967–2018

Constance Ellen Lawn ONZM (May 14, 1944 – April 2, 2018) was an American broadcast journalist. Lawn had a brief career in politics, working for a congressman and the 1968 Eugene McCarthy presidential campaign before entering journalism.

She reported from Washington for several international clients and was appointed an honorary Officer of the New Zealand Order of Merit in 2012 in recognition of her work. At the time of her death she was the longest-serving White House correspondent.

== Early life ==
Of Russian Jewish descent, Lawn was born in New Jersey to Howard Martin Lawn (1911–2000), a businessman who was president of Parkmobile Inc., and the Equity and Capital Company, and Pearl H. Bergman (1913–1989), a chemist and homemaker. Both her parents were staunch Democrats.

Her paternal grandfather, Sal Simon Lawn (1884–1969), was a Republican, who served as sergeant-at-arms for the Second Judicial Court and was a veteran of World War I.

Lawn was raised with her brother, Richard, and elder sister, Margo Rose (1940–1981).

She was the first and only girl to play for the Long Branch Little League in 1956. In 1962, Lawn graduated from Long Branch High School, and went on to receive a bachelor's degree in political science from Simmons College in 1966; she later moved to Washington, D.C. She was also a graduate of the L'In stitut d'Etudes Politiques in Paris.

== Political and reporting career ==
Lawn briefly worked for a U.S. congressman and served as a volunteer for Eugene McCarthy's 1968 presidential campaign before becoming a reporter for a news station in Washington, D.C. She spent her career as an unaffiliated journalist, unlike many of her fellow White House correspondents, and was the founder and sole employee of Audio Video News.

She reported for several clients in the United States and around the world. Her international radio clients included networks in the UK, Canada, New Zealand, Australia, Israel, and South Africa. In the 2012 New Year Honours, she was appointed an honorary Officer of the New Zealand Order of Merit in recognition of her services to New Zealand–United States relations.

This included writing articles for the US market promoting tourism to New Zealand and its ski resorts. Lawn also received a Lifetime Achievement Award from the National Press Club of New Zealand and had a champion race-horse named after her in that country.

Lawn covered Robert F. Kennedy's 1968 presidential campaign, travelling with him across the United States. She conducted one of the last interviews with Kennedy before his assassination in Los Angeles on June 5 of that year. Later that year, whilst reporting on the riots and protests around the 1968 Democratic National Convention, Lawn was beaten by Chicago police officers. She covered the 1968 Soviet Invasion of Czechoslovakia from Prague, the Watergate scandal of 1972, and the attempted assassination of Ronald Reagan in 1981. At around the time of the 1982 Lebanon War, Lawn avoided an attempted abduction in Lebanon by hitting her attacker in the face with a bag and escaping to Israeli soldiers.

At the time of her death Lawn was the longest-serving White House correspondent. She attended her last press briefing on December 14, 2017, a few months before her death.

== Personal life ==
Lawn's first marriage was in November 1973 to Stephen Rappaport, a certified public accountant. They had two sons; their marriage later ended in a divorce. She married Charles A. Sneiderman in 2000.

She was diagnosed with Parkinson's disease in 2011, and died on April 2, 2018, aged 73, in Falls Church, Virginia. In addition to her husband, she is survived by a brother, Richard Lawn; two sons from her first marriage, Daniel and David Rappaport; and two grandchildren.

== Bibliography ==
- Lawn, Connie (2000). You Wake Me Each Morning. San Jose [Calif.]: Writers Club Press. ISBN 9780595155279. OCLC 48017962.
- Myers, William Starr (2000). Prominent Families of New Jersey. Baltimore: Genealogical Publishing Company. ISBN 9780806350363. OCLC 46488954.
