= Rubicon River (New Zealand) =

River in the South Island of New Zealand

Coordinates: 43°20′S 171°54′E

The Rubicon River is a minor river in the South Island of New Zealand. It starts on the southeast flanks of the Torlesse Range and feeds into the Kowai River.
