= Des Britten =

New Zealand restaurateur (1937–2020)

Sir Des Britten KNZM
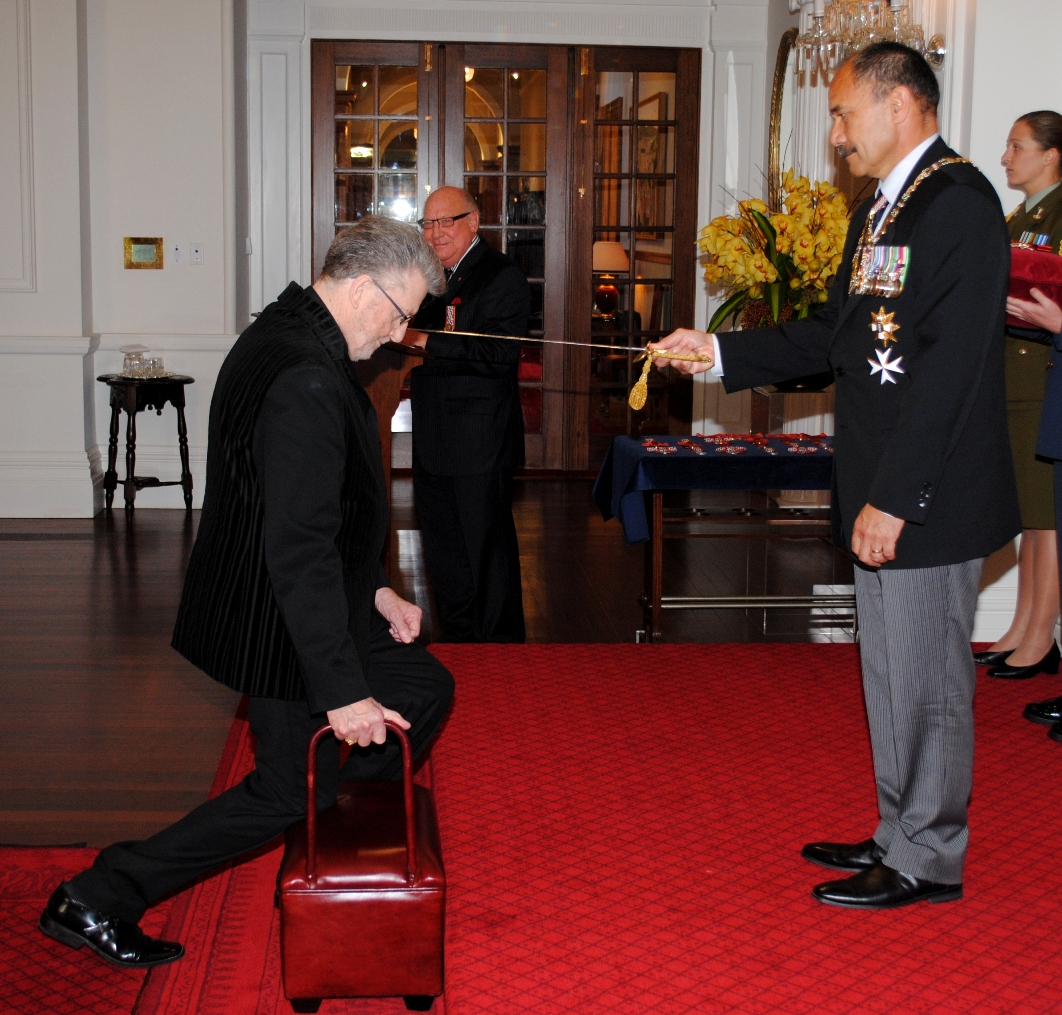
- Britten's investiture as a Knight Companion of the New Zealand Order of Merit by the governor-general, Sir Jerry Mateparae, in 2012
- Born: Desmond John Britten; 27 December 1937; Ōtāne, New Zealand
- Died: 13 February 2020 (aged 82); Wellington, New Zealand
- Occupation(s): Broadcaster; Restaurateur; Priest
- Known for: Celebrity chef Wellington City Missioner

Sir Desmond John Britten KNZM (27 December 1937 – 13 February 2020) was a New Zealand restaurateur, radio broadcaster, television chef, cookbook writer and Anglican priest. He served as Wellington City Missioner for 17 years, and was knighted in 2012.

== Early life and family ==
Britten was born in Ōtāne in Hawke's Bay on 27 December 1937. The son of a sheep farmer, he was educated at Napier Boys' High School, but left without any qualifications and then worked for a few years on the family farm.

== Career as broadcaster and restaurateur ==
Britten began his broadcasting career as a disc jockey in Napier and then Hamilton. After two years in Australia, he joined the NZBC as an announcer on Wellington radio station 2ZB. His dances for children at the Wellington Town Hall, known as the "Coca Cola Hi-Fi Club", proved popular.

In 1964, Britten and his wife Lorraine opened their fine-dining restaurant, "The Coachman", in Courtenay Place, Wellington, which they ran for 28 years. In the 1970s, Britten presented two cooking shows on New Zealand television: Thyme for Cookery and Bon Appetit.

In 1995, Britten received the Restaurant Association of New Zealand's Hall of Fame award.

== Priesthood ==
Britten was ordained an Anglican priest in 1983 and became the vicar of St Barnabas Roseneath, in Wellington. He was then head of the Wellington City Mission from 1994 to 2011. Following his retirement, he was made a Canon Emeritus in the Wellington diocese and was named the 2011 "Wellingtonian of the Year".

In the 2012 New Year Honours, Britten was appointed a Knight Companion of the New Zealand Order of Merit, for services to the community.

== Later life and death ==
In 2018, Britten was predeceased by his wife, Lorraine, Lady Britten, after more than 50 years of marriage. He died in Wellington on 13 February 2020 at the age of 82.

== Books ==
Britten wrote a number of cookbooks, including:

- Cooking with Des Britten. Wilson and Horton, Auckland (1971).
- Thyme for cookery. Hicks Smith, Wellington (1973).
- The Des Britten cookbook. Woolworths, Auckland (1977).
- Gourmet cooking for babies. Reed Methuen, Auckland (1987).
- Des Britten's foodie fables & other just desserts. Grantham House, Wellington (1996).
