= Amberley, New Zealand =

Town in Canterbury, New Zealand

Amberley
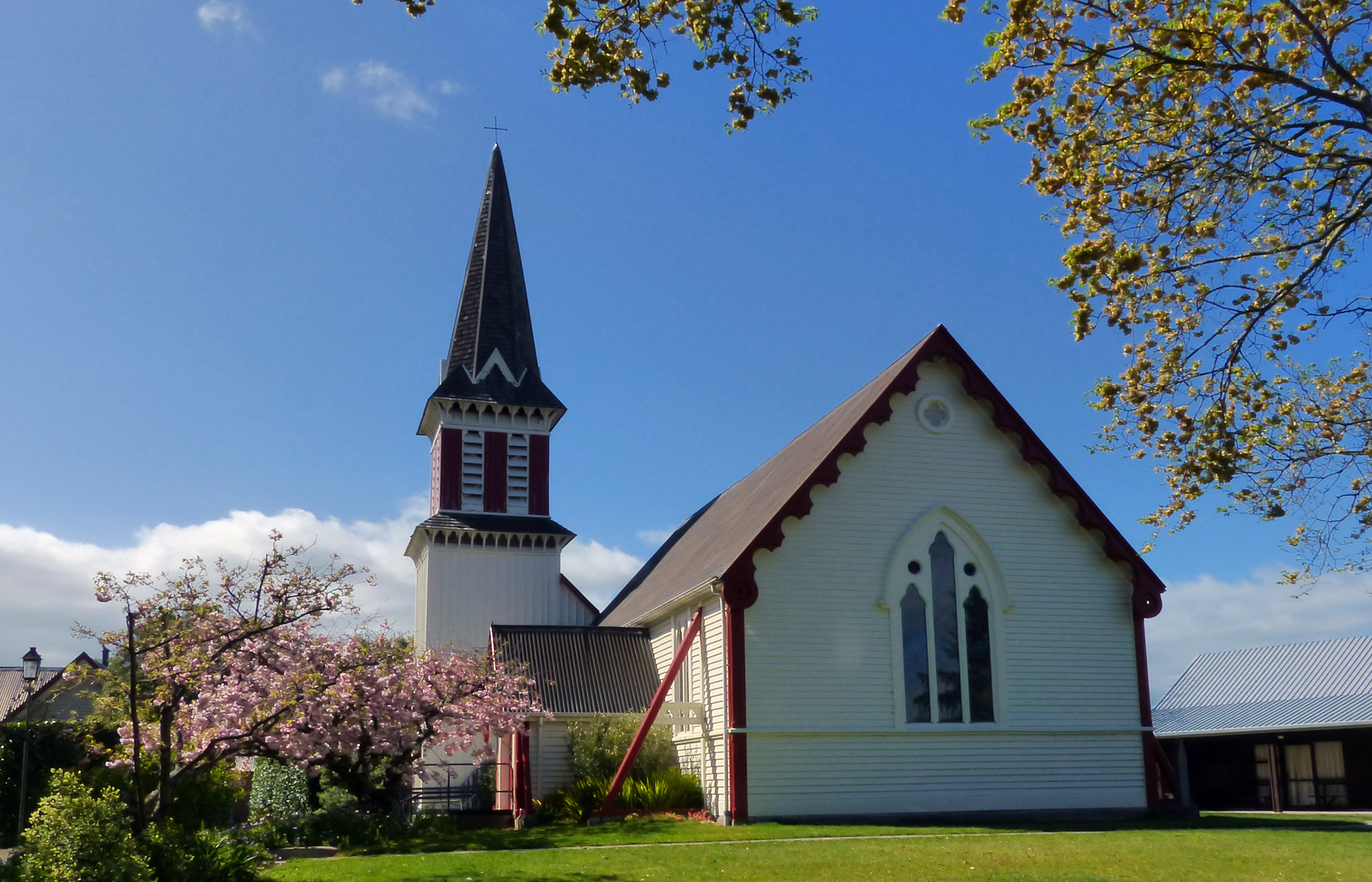
- Holy Innocent's Anglican Church, Amberley
- Interactive map of Amberley
- Coordinates: 43°9′20″S 172°43′50″E
- Country: New Zealand
- Region: Canterbury
- Territorial authority: Hurunui District
- Ward: South Ward
- Electorates: Kaikōura; Te Tai Tonga

Government
  - Territorial Authority: Hurunui District Council
  - Regional council: Environment Canterbury
  - Mayor of Hurunui: Marie Black
  - Kaikoura MP: Stuart Smith
  - Te Tai Tonga MP: Tākuta Ferris

Area
  - Total: 3.70 km^{2} (1.43 sq mi)
- Elevation: 50 m (160 ft)

Population (June 2025)
  - Total: 2,870
  - Density: 776/km^{2} (2,010/sq mi)
- Postcode: 7410
- Local iwi: Ngāi Tahu

Amberley is a town located in the Hurunui District in north Canterbury, on the east coast of the South Island of New Zealand. It is located on State Highway 1 approximately 50 km north of Christchurch. It is the seat of the Hurunui District Council. The nearest town to the north of Amberly via state highway one is Waipara (11 km) and the nearest town to the south is Leithfield (5.7 km).

== History ==
Amberley was established in 1864 by Mrs. Frederica Josephine Carter who owned freehold land north of the Kowai river. Mrs. Carter subdivided and sold her pastoral run for eight pounds per quarter acre. This price was very attractive as it made the land some of the cheapest in Canterbury. The town was named Amberley after Mrs. Carter's family farm in Oxfordshire, England. The earliest residents included a blacksmith, a wheelwright and a carpenter. A courthouse was established in 1870. The town developed slowly at first until the railway, built by Canterbury Provincial Railways, arrived in 1876. With the arrival of the railway, the town grew quickly and a town hall was completed in 1878 which could seat 400 people. The Anglican church was built in 1877 with room for 140 parishioners. It was destroyed by a "hurricane" in 1889 leaving only the tower standing. The church was then rebuilt at a cost of about £700. The Wesleyan church was built in 1882 with room for 120 parishioners. A branch (a two-story building) of the Bank of New South Wales was established in Amberley in 1890. In 1908 a telephone exchange was opened in Amberley. By this time Amberley had 96 houses or other dwellings and was home to more than 800 people.

A decision to install a water supply for Amberley was made in 1953 with the work being completed in 1957. It was deemed a success and considered "the best thing that has ever happened to Amberley". It was further extended in 1958 and again in 1967. In 1963, planning permission was granted for four shops to be built on Main North Road. This led to other retail businesses moving to Main North Road and further growth in Amberley. Work on a sewage scheme began in 1973. By 1979, around half the properties in Amberley were connected to it.

The Marathon Rubber Footwear factory closed in December 1977 which resulted in 26 redundancies. Amberley was upgraded to an automatic telephone exchange in 1978. By 1986, Amberley had grown to a population of 897 people with a further 144 people living at Amberley Beach.

In early February 2020, a fire at an illegal tyre dump containing 160,000 tyres caused significant air pollution for local residents.

== Demographics ==
Amberley is described by Stats NZ as a small urban area and covers 3.70 km^{2} (1.43 sq mi). It had an estimated population of 2,870 as of June 2025, with a population density of 776 people per km^{2}.

Historical population for Amberley
Year	Pop.	±% p.a.
2006	1,305	—
2013	1,584	+2.81%
2018	2,070	+5.50%
2023	2,520	+4.01%
The 2006 population is for a smaller area of 3.63 km^{2}. Source:

Amberley had a population of 2,520 in the 2023 New Zealand census, an increase of 450 people (21.7%) since the 2018 census, and an increase of 936 people (59.1%) since the 2013 census. There were 1,200 males, 1,311 females, and 6 people of other genders in 1,050 dwellings. 2.5% of people identified as LGBTIQ+. The median age was 52.7 years (compared with 38.1 years nationally). There were 402 people (16.0%) aged under 15 years, 291 (11.5%) aged 15 to 29, 981 (38.9%) aged 30 to 64, and 846 (33.6%) aged 65 or older.

People could identify as more than one ethnicity. The results were 92.9% European (Pākehā); 9.2% Māori; 0.8% Pasifika; 3.0% Asian; 0.5% Middle Eastern, Latin American and African New Zealanders (MELAA); and 3.1% other, which includes people giving their ethnicity as "New Zealander". English was spoken by 98.2%, Māori by 1.3%, Samoan by 0.1%, and other languages by 5.4%. No language could be spoken by 1.4% (e.g. too young to talk). New Zealand Sign Language was known by 0.2%. The percentage of people born overseas was 17.6, compared with 28.8% nationally.

Religious affiliations were 31.2% Christian, 0.5% Hindu, 0.2% Māori religious beliefs, 0.2% Buddhist, 0.2% New Age, 0.1% Jewish, and 1.1% other religions. People who answered that they had no religion were 59.0%, and 7.4% of people did not answer the census question.

Of those at least 15 years old, 327 (15.4%) people had a bachelor's or higher degree, 1,194 (56.4%) had a post-high school certificate or diploma, and 603 (28.5%) people exclusively held high school qualifications. The median income was $33,000, compared with $41,500 nationally. 153 people (7.2%) earned over $100,000 compared to 12.1% nationally. The employment status of those at least 15 was 846 (39.9%) full-time, 315 (14.9%) part-time, and 39 (1.8%) unemployed.

== Economy ==
The economy in Amberley is in part based on providing services to the dairy farming, arable farming and sheep farming and grape growing industries in the wider district. Many people commute to jobs in Christchurch each day from Amberley.

== Climate ==
The warmest months of the year are January and February, with an average high temperature of 23 °C. The coldest month of the year occurs in July, when the average high temperature is 11 °C. Monthly rainfall ranges between an average of 48mm in January to 85mm in July.

== Local information ==
Amberley is the seat of the Hurunui District Council. Once a year, the local A&P (Agricultural and Pastoral) show is held, usually mid-Spring. The Amberley Swimming Pool is located at the Amberley Domain. It is a 25-yard, 5 lanes, solar heated, public swimming pool. There is also a playground, skate park, bowls club, tennis and squash courts and multiple playing fields for rugby, soccer and cricket at the Amberley Domain.

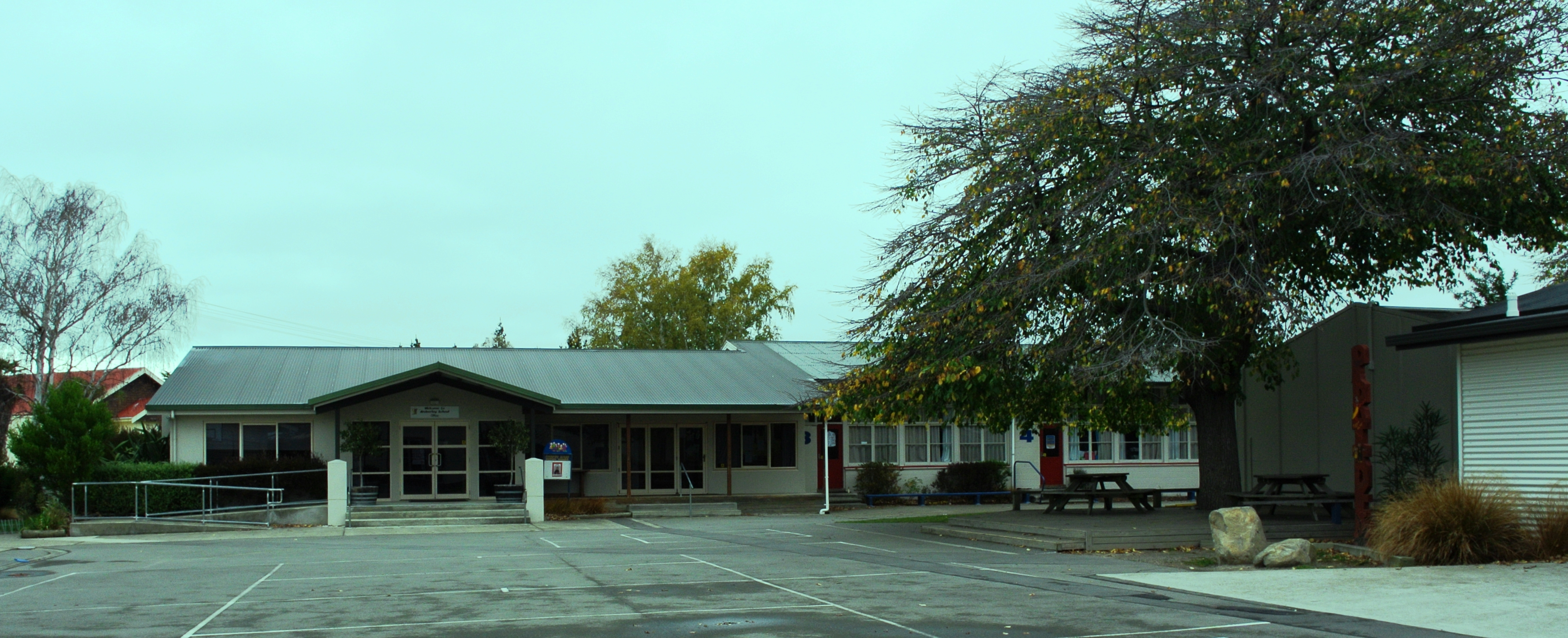
Amberley Primary School

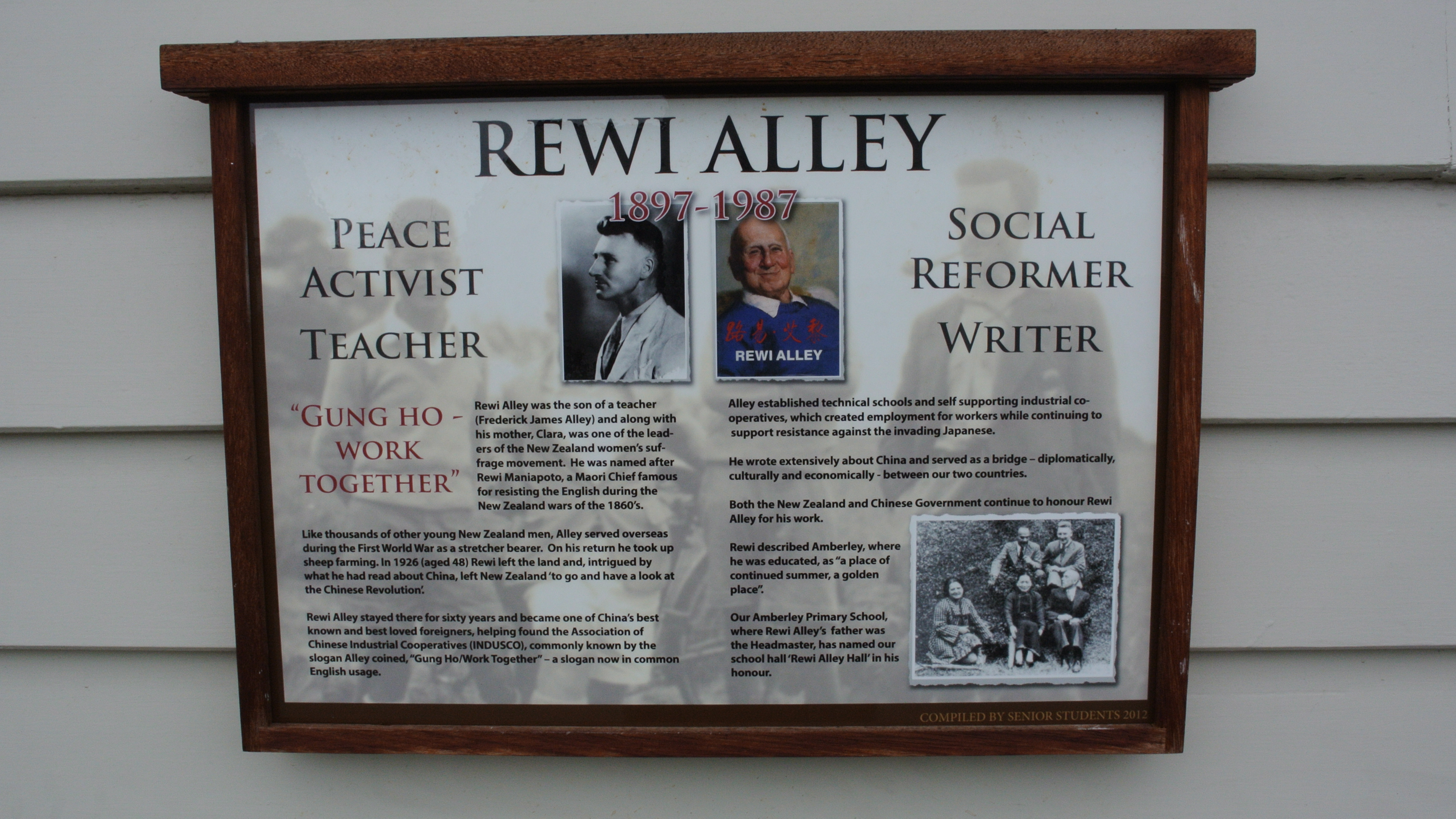
Rewi Alley Memorial

== Notable buildings ==
=== The Church of the Holy Passion of our Lord ===
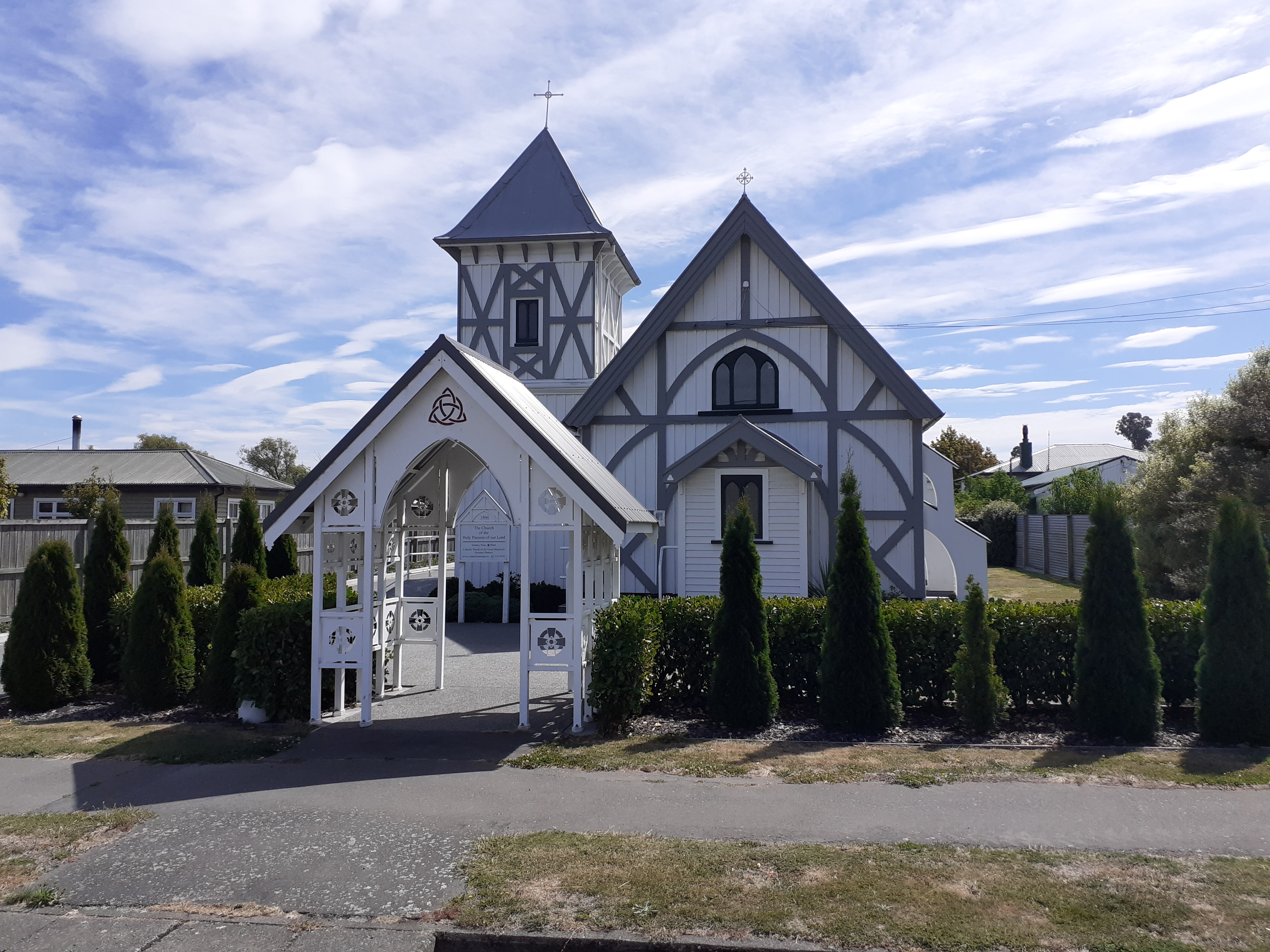
Catholic Church, Amberley (2021)

The Catholic Church of the Most Holy Passion was built in 1866 by Sir Frederick Weld. It was moved to its Amberley site on State Highway 1 in the mid-1950s.

=== Holy Innocents Anglican Church ===
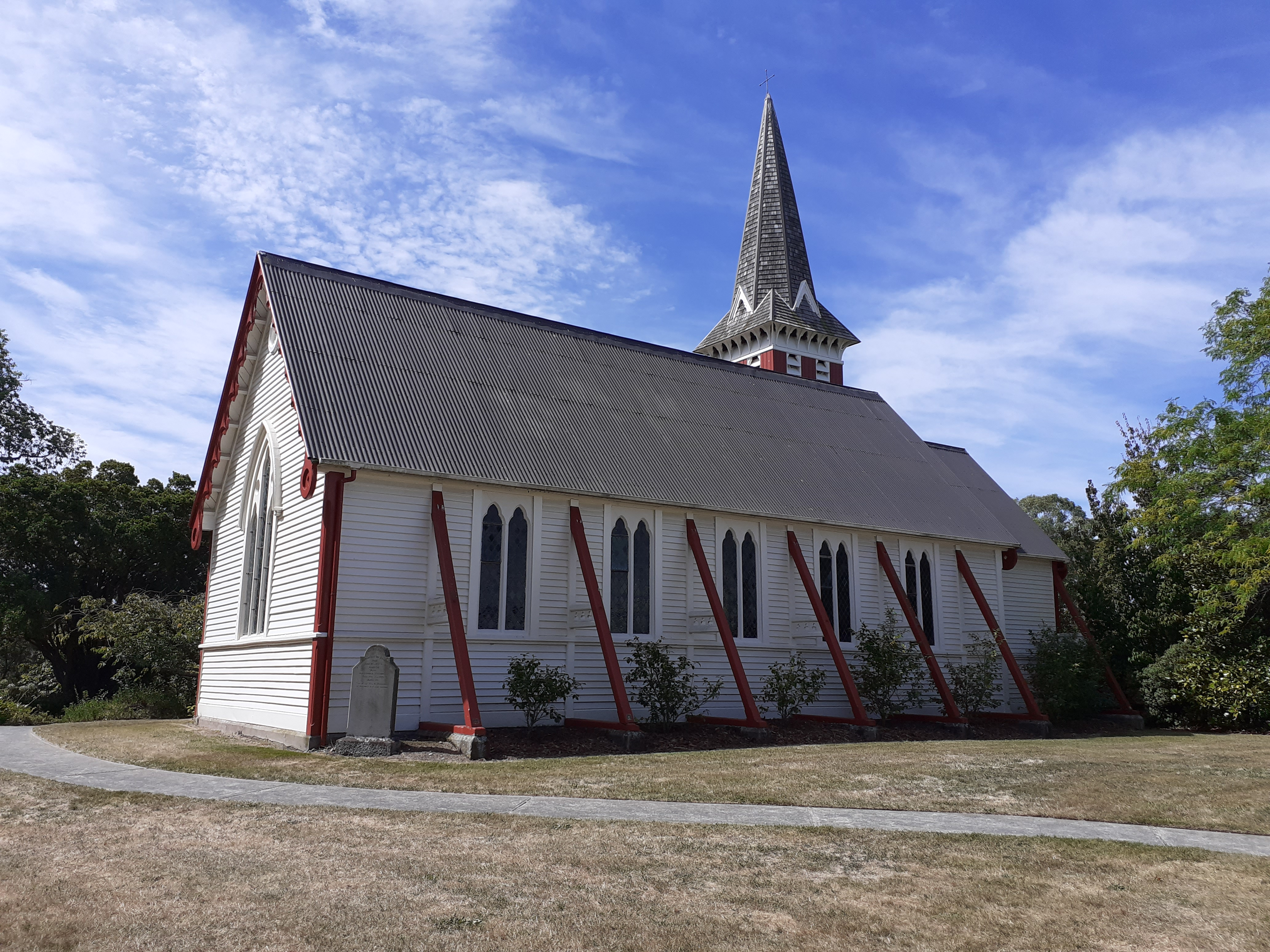
Anglican Church, Amberley (2021)

Located on Church Street.

=== Cob Cottage ===
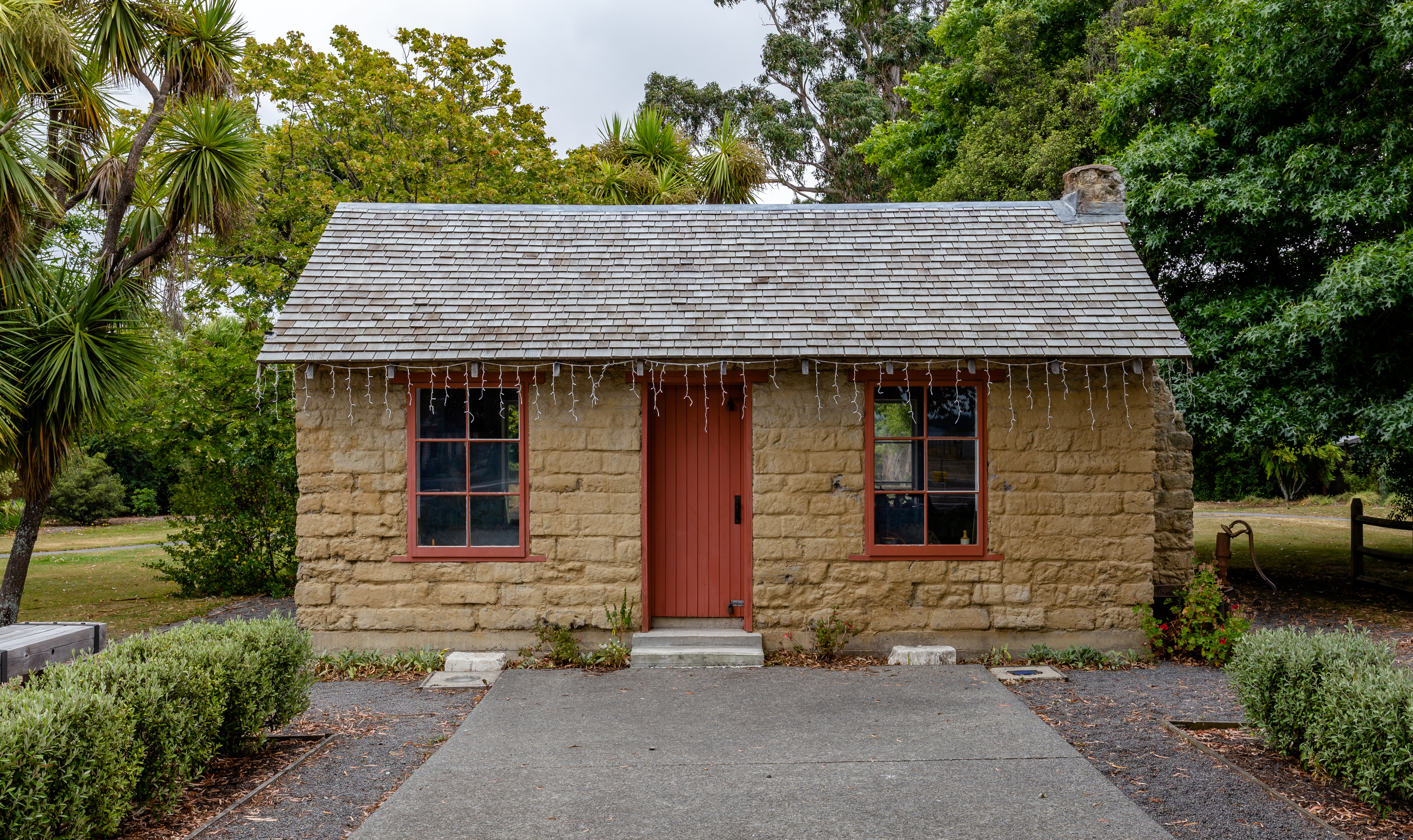
Cob Cottage, Amberley, New Zealand

The Cob Cottage is located in Chamberlain Park. it suffered significant damage in 1975 because of gale force nor westerly winds. The damage was such that an upper floor had to be removed. It is owned by the Amberley Historical Society and houses a collection of furnishings and clothing from the early settlers of the area.

=== Amberley House ===
Amberley House was built between 1870 and 1876. In 1920 the property was converted into the Amberley House Girls’ Collegiate School. The house was extended by and converted into the school by building two stories to the original house. The school closed in 1942. Previous owners built extensive stables to support a horse breeding business. There are extensive grounds and it operates part time as a wedding venue and offers garden tours.

=== Charles Upham statue ===
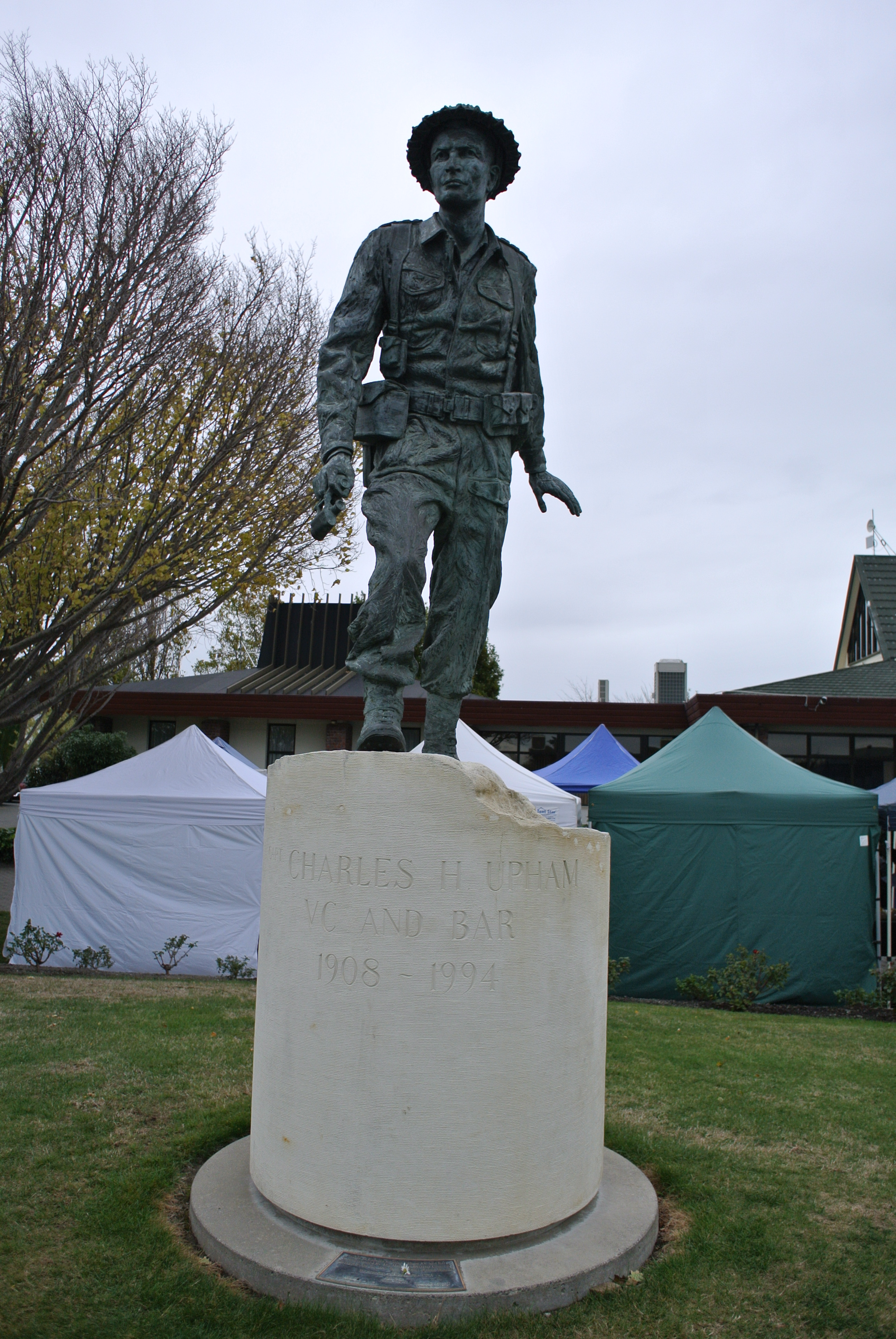
Charles Upham statue

There is a statue in memory of Charles Upham just outside the council building. Upham farmed in the Cheviot area. Nearby the statue sit three limestone carvings, labelled The Grandmothers, which celebrate the ancient Waitaha people. Carved by Sculptor Warren Thompson, the statues were unveiled in May 2003 by the Rt. Hon. Helen Clark, Prime Minister of New Zealand.

== Notable people ==
- Alan Johns (1917–1997), scientist, chief executive and university administrator; was born in Amberley and grew up in the town
- Kate Harcourt, New Zealand actress.

== Education ==
The Amberley school was established in 1872 with three classrooms. By 1902 it had 122 students. Amberley School is a co-educational state primary school for Year 1 to 8 students, with a roll of 244 as of July 2026. Amberley Primary School's Rewi Alley Community Centre has a memorial to Rewi Alley who attended there.

== Amberley Beach ==
Amberley itself sits inland on state highway one and the main train line running north from Christchurch to Picton. Amberley Beach is located 4.6 km away from Amberley on Amberley Beach Road. A small number of houses, a camping ground and the Amberley Beach Reserve are located by the beach, Amberley Beach itself is a shingle rather than a sandy beach. It is popular for walking, swimming, surfing and fishing. The Amberley beach walkway offers a 20-minute walk of native bush and water features. The Amberley Lions helped to build this walkway.

Amberley Beach is described as a rural settlement by Stats NZ and has an area of 0.21 km^{2} (0.081 sq mi).ref name="Area"/> It had an estimated population of 170 as of June 2025, with a population density of 810 people per km^{2}. Amberley Beach is part of the larger Balcairn statistical area.

Historical population for Amberley Beach
Year	Pop.	±% p.a.
2006	141	—
2013	165	+2.27%
2018	171	+0.72%
2023	180	+1.03%
The 2006 population is for a larger area of 0.27 km^{2}. Source:

Amberley Beach had a population of 180 in the 2023 New Zealand census, an increase of 9 people (5.3%) since the 2018 census, and an increase of 15 people (9.1%) since the 2013 census. There were 93 males and 87 females in 99 dwellings. 3.3% of people identified as LGBTIQ+. The median age was 54.8 years (compared with 38.1 years nationally). There were 15 people (8.3%) aged under 15 years, 18 (10.0%) aged 15 to 29, 93 (51.7%) aged 30 to 64, and 51 (28.3%) aged 65 or older.

People could identify as more than one ethnicity. The results were 91.7% European (Pākehā); 15.0% Māori; 1.7% Middle Eastern, Latin American and African New Zealanders (MELAA); and 6.7% other, which includes people giving their ethnicity as "New Zealander". English was spoken by 96.7%, Māori by 3.3%, and other languages by 3.3%. No language could be spoken by 1.7% (e.g. too young to talk). The percentage of people born overseas was 13.3, compared with 28.8% nationally.

Religious affiliations were 26.7% Christian, and 1.7% New Age. People who answered that they had no religion were 60.0%, and 11.7% of people did not answer the census question.

Of those at least 15 years old, 24 (14.5%) people had a bachelor's or higher degree, 99 (60.0%) had a post-high school certificate or diploma, and 39 (23.6%) people exclusively held high school qualifications. The median income was $30,700, compared with $41,500 nationally. 6 people (3.6%) earned over $100,000 compared to 12.1% nationally. The employment status of those at least 15 was 75 (45.5%) full-time, 15 (9.1%) part-time, and 3 (1.8%) unemployed.

== Amberley Golf Course ==
Amberley has an 18-hole golf course that runs tournaments throughout the year. The Amberley Golf Club was founded in 1922. The golf course was originally a total of 9 holes based on sheep paddocks opposite Amberley House on state highway one. By 1940 the number of members increased to 63. Electricity was installed in the club-house. Due to World War 2, the club went into recess in 1942 and the course reverted to sheep paddocks. In 1954, a new course at Amberley Beach was proposed. With much voluntary effort a 13 holes course was formed and opened for play in 1955. Two further holes were added in 1957. The final three holes were completed in 1959. A new club-house was also built in 1959. In 1974, a pond was excavated near the seventeenth hole which provided irrigation for the course. Irrigating all the fairways continued to be a challenge and a new watering system was installed in 1992.
