= Don Mathieson (lawyer) =

New Zealand barrister

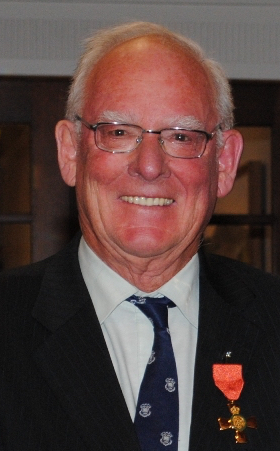
Mathieson in 2012, after his investiture as an Officer of the New Zealand Order of Merit

Donald Lindsay Mathieson ONZM KC is a New Zealand lawyer and lay Anglican.

== Biography ==
From 1940 to 1953, Mathieson was educated at Nelson College, where he was a prefect and dux in his final year, and a member of the school's 1st XI hockey team for three years. He then studied at Victoria University College, graduating BA LLB in 1959. While at Victoria, he also played chess and hockey, before winning a Rhodes Scholarship in 1959 to University College, Oxford.

In addition to spending more than 40 years in private practice, Mathieson was Crown Counsel in the Crown Law Office. From 2010 to 2015 he was President of the Film and Literature Board of Review.

In the 2012 New Year Honours, Mathieson was appointed an Officer of the New Zealand Order of Merit, for services to the law and legal education.

Mathieson, an active lay Anglican, edited Faith at work in 2001, 'arguing that Christians should practise their faith at work.' He wrote on the subject of same-sex marriage, in context of the Anglican church adapting to the Marriage (Definition of Marriage) Amendment Act 2013:

It is time to speak forthrightly in support of the clear scriptural witness about the sinfulness of homosexual acts and the position adopted without dissension by Roman Catholic, Protestant and Eastern Orthodox Churches alike for nearly two thousand years.

== Significant and dissenting decisions ==
- L.A. Zombie [2011] NZFLBR 2 (7 June 2011)
- Into the River by Ted Dawe [2013] NZFLBR 1 (17 December 2013)

== Works ==
- Mathieson, Don, ed. (2001). Faith at Work. Castle Pub. ISBN 0958212481.
- Mathieson, Don, ed. (2012). Cross on Evidence (9th ed.). LexisNexis NZ. ISBN 978-1927183892.
- "Fair criminal trial and the exclusion of 'unfair evidence'". New Zealand Universities Law Review. 25 (4): 739–757. October 2013.
- "Clergy, offices and employment". New Zealand Law Journal: 65–68. March 2006.
- "Same sex relationships: ethics, Christian leadership and the law". Stimulus: The New Zealand Journal of Christian Thought and Practice. 7 (1): 34–41. February 1999.
- "Principles and rules in Christian ethics". Latimer Journal (107): 8–16. March 1991.
- "Legal frameworks" (PDF). Archifacts: 44–54. October 1996.
