= Chris Kenny (boxing trainer) =

New Zealand boxing trainer

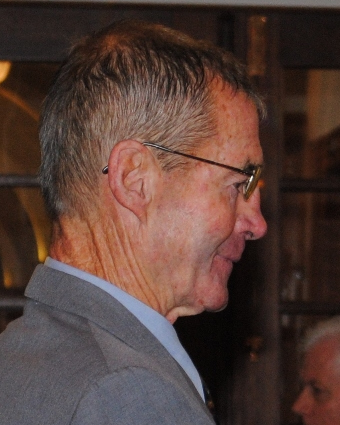
Kenny in 2012

Christopher Patrick Kenny ONZM (13 March 1937 – 2 February 2016) was an Irish-born New Zealand boxing coach. He coached New Zealand squads and teams to the Commonwealth and Olympic Games. He coached his son Michael Kenny to a gold medal at the 1990 Commonwealth Games.

In the 2012 New Year Honours, Kenny was appointed an Officer of the New Zealand Order of Merit for services to boxing.

Kenny died at his home in Tītahi Bay on 2 February 2016.
