= Pati Umaga =

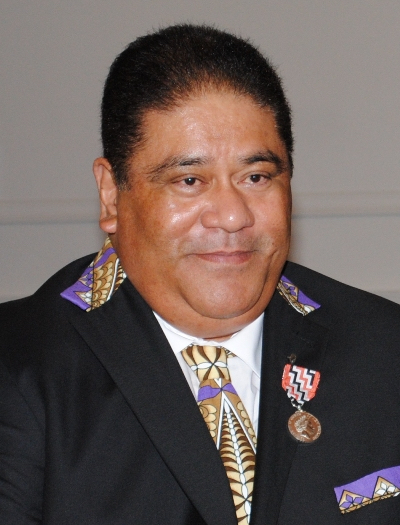
Umaga in 2012

Fonotī Pati Peni Umaga QSM is a New Zealand musician known for his compositions and musicianship as a bass guitar player, and significant contributions to the music industry, as well as his advocacy for the Pacific and Disabled communities. He works in the disability services sector.

== Early life ==
Umaga's parents were part of the 15,000 Samoans who immigrated to New Zealand between the 1950s to 1970s, first arriving in Newtown, Wellington, before moving to Wainuiomata in 1964, where housing was affordable. They set up the first Samoan church in the area. Umaga had an accident in 2005 that left him with a disability.

== Community involvement ==
Umaga received the Queens Service Medal in the 2012 New Year Honours, for services to the Pacific community, and in 2015 he was awarded the Arts Access Te Putanga Toi Arts Access Award for Artistic Achievement.

He was the first recipient of Creative New Zealand's Arts Pasifika Awards, Pacific Toa Award in 2019, and was also inducted into the Attitude Awards Hall of Fame that same year. When he received the award his thoughts about it were: "For the disabled community to be acknowledged in this way, promoting and advocating for full participation and inclusion in our Pacific community in the broader art sector."

In 2021 Umaga wrote a composition that was presented at the Kia Mau Festival called Le Taua o le Pepeve’a about a special 'kingly fine mat' called Pepeve'a that was gifted to a son by his father that 'launched sibling rivalry and a war over titles and the kingship' in the 16th century. Other music Umaga has created includes a song to address stigma of disability called Rise and Shine featuring high-school student group 'Tone6'.

Umaga is an Inquiry Senior Pasefika Engagement Advisor for the New Zealand Royal Commission of Inquiry into Abuse in Care that is 'looking into what happened to children, young people and vulnerable adults in State and faith-based care in New Zealand between the years 1950–99.' As part of this work 'fono' (a Samoan word that relates to meetings or councils) were held to inform the community as well as speaking engagements at organisations such as at Spectrum Care in 2020.

Umaga is a trustee of the Pacific Music Awards.
