= Kowai River =

Coordinates: 43°19′1″S 171°58′37″E

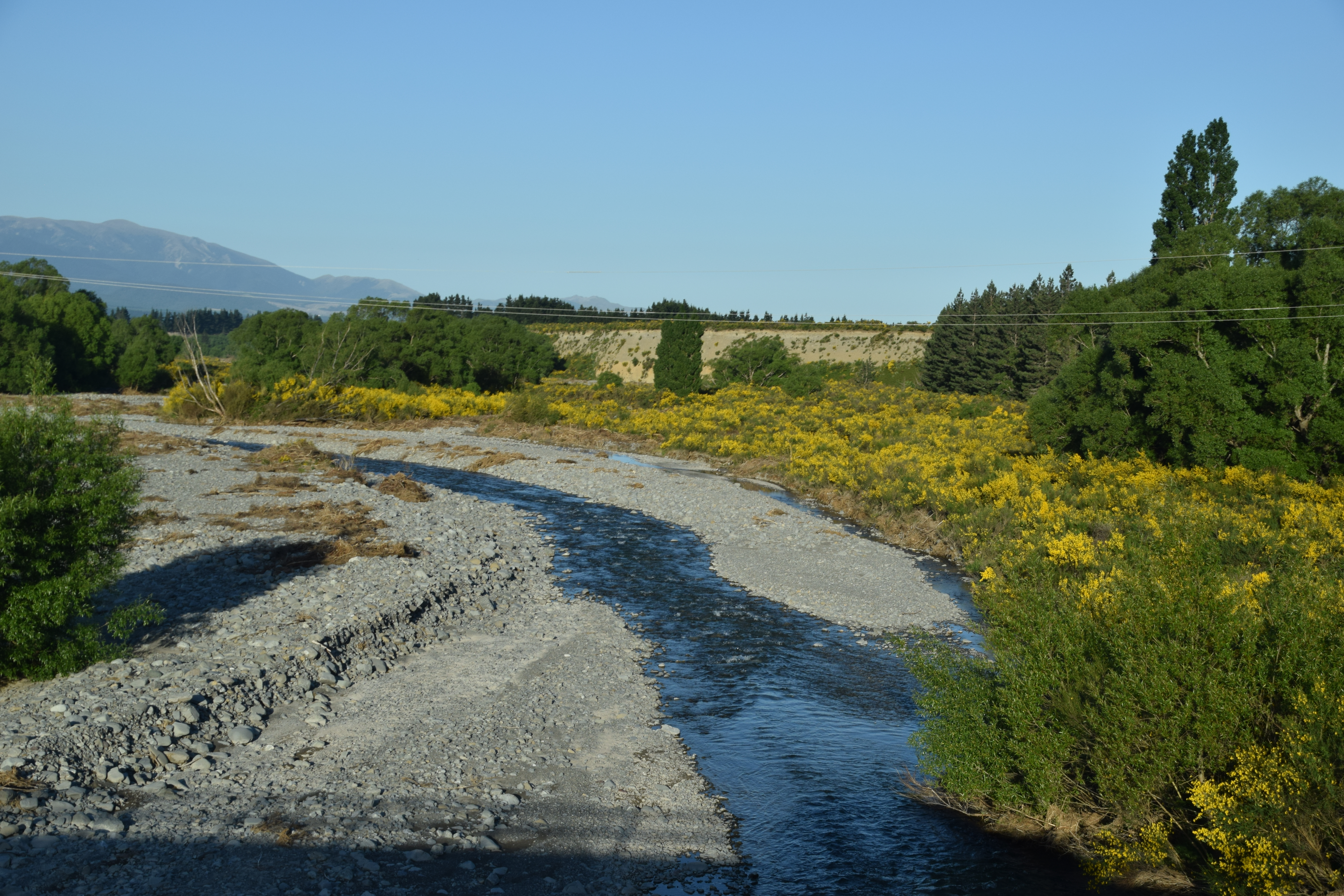

Location
- Country: New Zealand

Physical characteristics
- Source
  - location: Torless Range
  - elevation: 1,450 m (4,760 ft)
- Mouth
  - location: Waimakariri River
  - elevation: 297 m (974 ft)

Basin features
- Tributaries
  - left: Rubicon River, Little Kowai River

The Kowai River is a river in the Canterbury region of New Zealand. It rises on the southern flanks of the Torlesse Range and travels south, emerging from the foothills of the Southern Alps near Springfield. The river turns east across the upper Canterbury Plains before joining the Waimakariri River. State Highway 73 follows the river as it climbs towards Porters Pass.
