= 1888 North Canterbury earthquake =

Earthquake in New Zealand

- Location within New Zealand
- UTC time: 1888-08-31 16:40
- Local date: 1 September 1888
- Local time: 04:10
- Magnitude: 7.0–7.3
- Depth: 12 km
- Epicentre: 42°36′S 172°24′E
- Areas affected: South Island New Zealand
- Casualties: 1 fatality (indirect)

The 1888 North Canterbury earthquake occurred at 4:10 am on 1 September following a sequence of foreshocks that started the previous evening, and whose epicentre was in the North Canterbury region of the South Island of New Zealand. The epicentre was approximately 35 kilometres (22 mi) west of Hanmer.

In Christchurch, about 100 kilometres (62 mi) southeast of the epicentre, shaking lasted for 40 to 50 seconds. The magnitude of the earthquake is estimated to be in the range 7.0–7.3. Severe damage to farm buildings in the epicentral region was reported and the top 7.8 metres (26 ft) of the spire of ChristChurch Cathedral collapsed. It was the first earthquake observed to be associated with mainly horizontal fault displacement.

== Tectonic setting ==
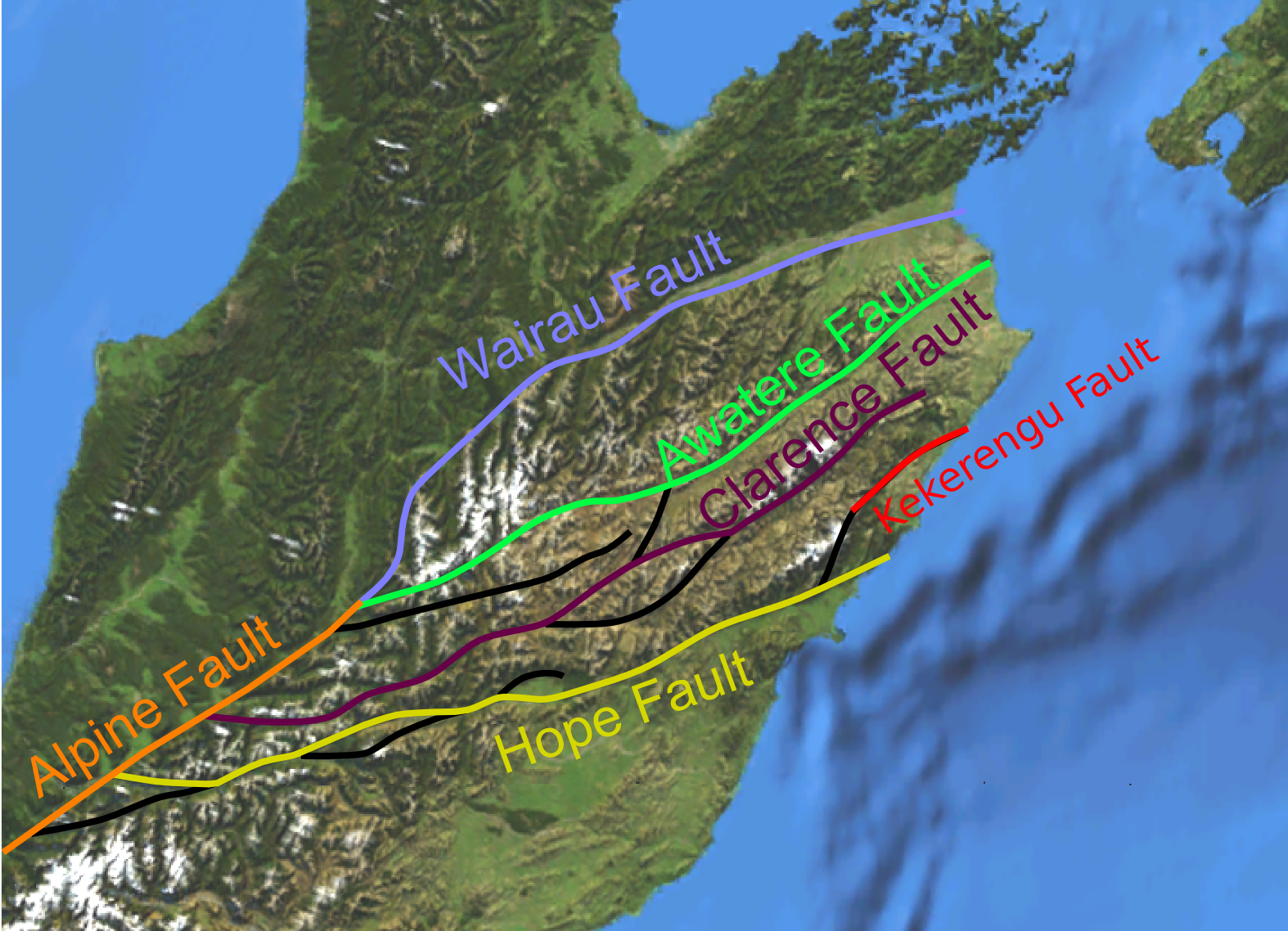
Map of the Marlborough Fault System showing location of the Hope Fault

New Zealand lies along the boundary between the Australian and Pacific plates.

In the South Island, most of the relative displacement between these plates is taken up along a single dextral (right lateral) strike-slip fault with a major reverse component, the Alpine Fault.

In the North Island, displacement is mainly taken up along the Kermadec-Tonga subduction zone, although the remaining dextral strike-slip component is accommodated by the North Island Fault System.

== Earthquake ==
The earthquake occurred on the Hope Fault, one of the group of dextral strike-slip structures known as the Marlborough fault system that transfer displacement between the mainly transform and convergent type plate boundaries in a complex zone at the northern end of South Island. Alexander McKay, a geologist working for the geological survey, observed horizontal offsets in farm fences between 1.5 and 2.6 metres (4.9 and 8.5 ft) along the fault. He was the first to associate a strike-slip displacement with an earthquake.

=== Damage ===
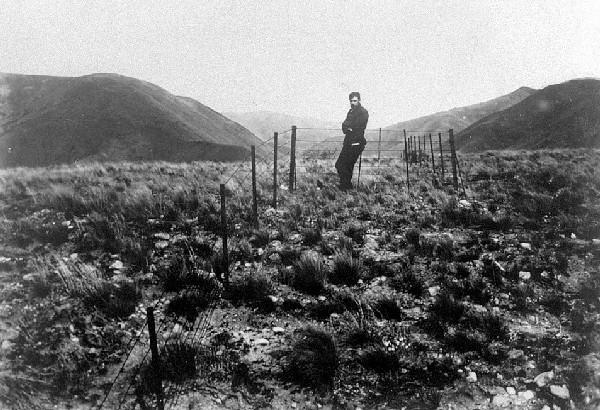
This surveyor stands at a fence that crosses the Hope Fault near Glynn Wye Station. The fence, originally straight, has been kinked by the sideways movement of the land.

In the North Canterbury region many buildings were severely damaged, particularly in the Hope Valley and Hanmer areas. Landslides occurred in unconsolidated sediment and fissures up to 30 centimetres (12 in) wide were observed.

In Christchurch, the top 7.8 metres (26 ft) of the Cathedral spire fell down and minor damage, such as broken chimneys, affected many houses. The Durham Street Methodist Church, Christchurch's first church build with permanent materials, suffered some damage to its stonework. Another building affected was the Christchurch Normal School, where chimneys fell down and ceilings were cracked.

Damage was greatest in the northern and northwestern suburbs, probably due to the peaty sub-soil.

One person died of a heart attack during the earthquake.

== See also ==
- 1848 Marlborough earthquake
- 1901 Cheviot earthquake
- 2013 Lake Grassmere earthquake
- 2013 Seddon earthquake
- 2016 Kaikōura earthquake
- List of earthquakes in New Zealand
- List of historical earthquakes
