= Richard Sibson =

Richard Sibson is the name of

- Richard B. Sibson (1911–1994), New Zealand ornithologist
- Richard H. Sibson (born 1945), New Zealand geologist
