= Kekerengu Fault =

Active fault in New Zealand

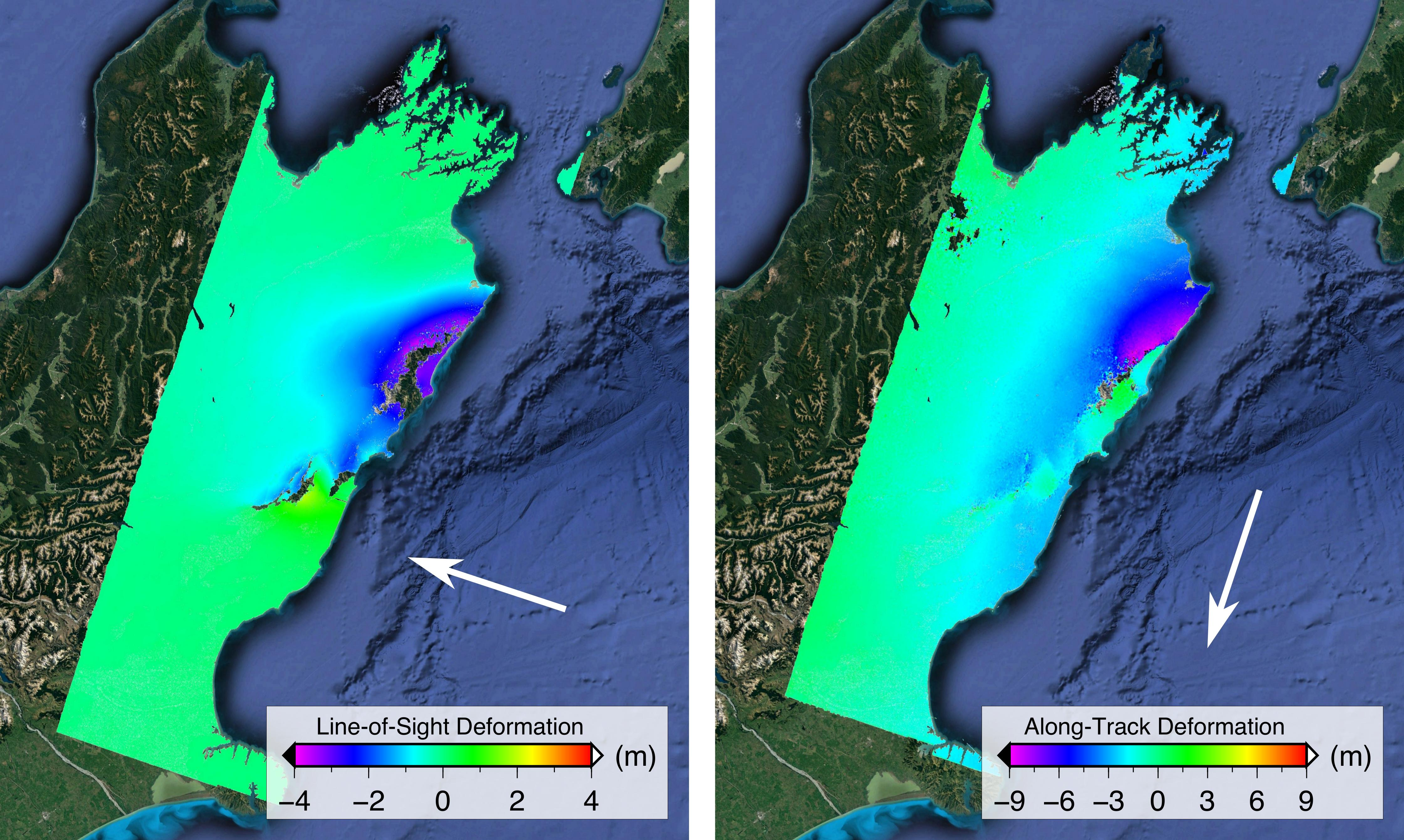
Satellite radar image showing ground motion effects during the 2016 Kaikōura earthquake

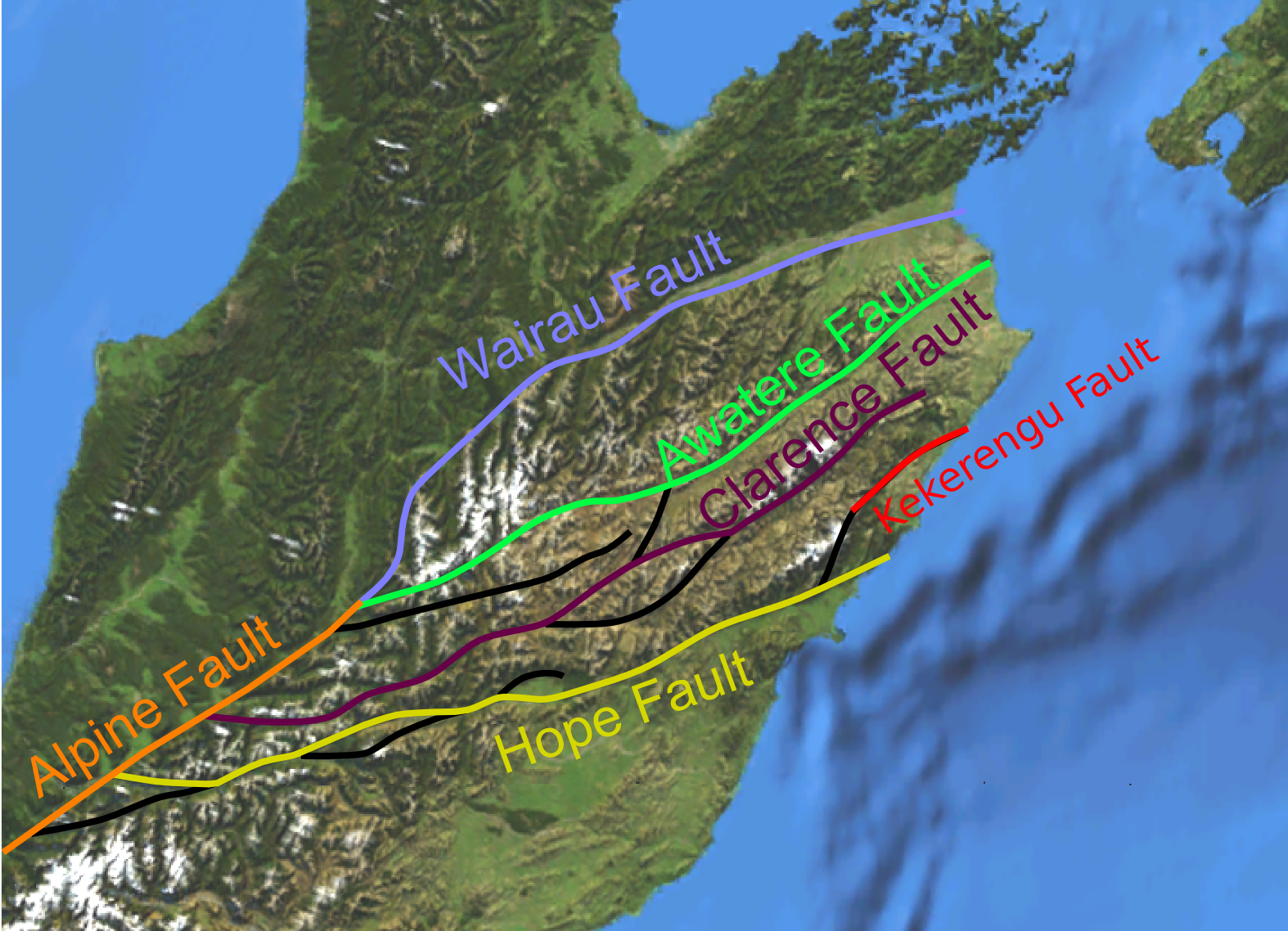
Map of the Marlborough Fault System

The Kekerengu Fault is an active dextral (right lateral) strike-slip fault in the northeastern part of South Island, New Zealand. It is closely associated with the Hope Fault and Jordan Thrust at its south-easternmost edge and likely joins with the Clarence Fault to form the Wairarapa Fault offshore in Cook Strait.

Early investigations immediately following the 14 November 2016 Kaikōura earthquake indicated that up to 10 m (33 ft) of motion may have occurred on the Kekerengu Fault during the 7.8 magnitude quake. The maximum displacement was later found to be 12.0 m (39.4 ft) ± 0.7 m (2 ft 4 in). During this earthquake the offshore continuation of the Kekerengu Fault to the north east, known as the Needles Fault, ruptured as well. NIWA marine geologist Dr Philip Barnes said the length of the Kekerengu–Needles Fault rupture may extend for about 70 km (43 mi), consisting of 36 km (22 mi) on land and 34 km (21 mi) under the sea.
