= Wairau Fault =

Active fault in New Zealand

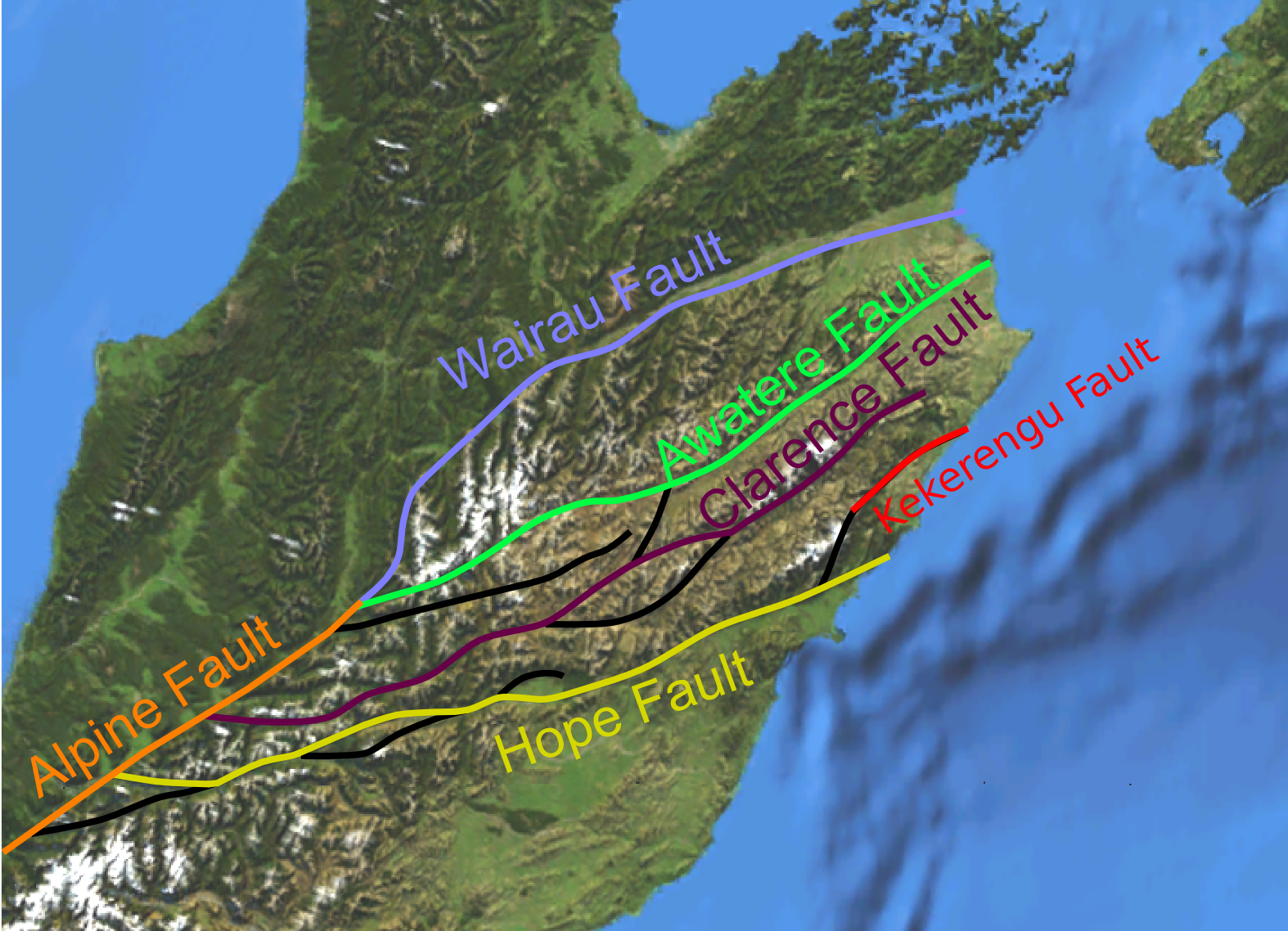
- Map of the Marlborough Fault System with Wairau Fault in light purple
- Etymology: Wairau River
- Country: New Zealand
- Region: Marlborough

Characteristics
- Range: up to 7.7 M_{W}
- Length: 200 km (120 mi)
- Displacement: 3.5 mm (0.14 in)/year

Tectonics
- Plate: Indo-Australian, Pacific
- Status: Active
- Earthquakes: prehistoric
- Type: Strike-slip fault
- Movement: Dextral/convergent, east side up
- Age: Miocene-Holocene
- Orogeny: Kaikoura
- New Zealand geology database (includes faults)

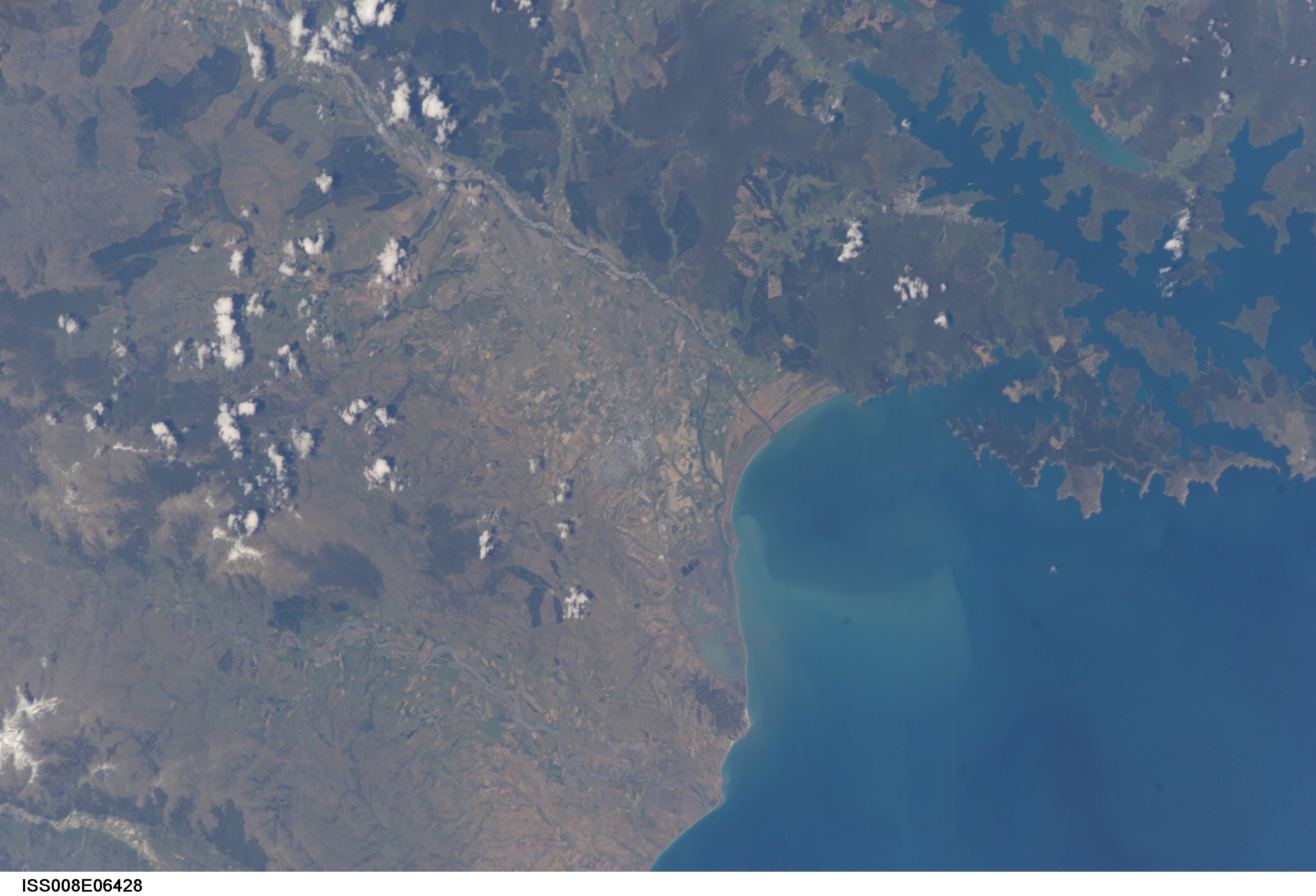
The eastern end of the Wairau Fault reaches the sea at the outlet of the Wairau River in Cloudy Bay in this view from the north east. The hills beyond the fault line that runs along the Wairau River (middle of photo) are the Richmond Range.

The Wairau Fault is an active dextral (right lateral) strike-slip fault in the northeastern part of South Island, New Zealand. It forms part of the Marlborough fault system, which accommodates the transfer of displacement along the oblique convergent boundary between the Indo-Australian plate and Pacific plate, from the transform Alpine Fault to the Hikurangi Trough subduction zone.

== Extent ==
Depending on the precise definition used, the Wairau Fault runs either from southern or northern end of 'The Bends' region. In the former case it is regarded as the Wairau segment of the Alpine Fault which means the Alpine Fault is about 800 km (500 mi) long. In the latter case it is regarded as a separate fault and runs about 200 km (120 mi) from near Lake Rotoiti to the edge of the continental shelf in Cook Strait near Cloudy Bay in the east. To the west, the fault is a single strand but near Wairau Valley township, the fault splits into two strands. These two strands continue to within about 15 kilometres (9.3 mi) of the coast near Renwick. Further to the east only the southernmost strand can be detected intermittently by lidar and with offshore mapping. It takes its name from the Wairau River, which follows the fault trace for most of its length on land.

== Geology ==
The fault follows a valley where Pleistocene and Holocene deposits have been laid down over bedrock during the last two million years and where the river often obscures recent fault traces. The underlying bedrock which is very rarely exposed along the fault line itself is to the fault's north the Dun Mountain, Maitai and Caples terranest and Triassic and Cretaceous greywacke otherwise. The western fault zone width is about 300 m (980 ft) and contains several fault scarps up to 5 m (16 ft) high.

=== Relationship to Alpine Fault ===
As said above, some have regarded it as a segment of the Alpine Fault. This does not concord with the rest of the Alpine Fault having a fairly predictable relatively short recurrence interval for major earthquakes of 291 ± 21 years with good evidence for multi-segment rupture on many of these events over the last 2000 years. The last rupture that may also have involved the Alpine Fault is about 2000 years ago which does not apply to the other active segments of the Alpine Fault (see timeline).

It has been stated that "Co-rupture of the Wairau and Alpine faults during great earthquakes occurs rarely (if at all) on millennial or longer timescales."

== Recent seismicity ==
There was an event confined to the coastal and off shore portions of the fault that is poorly constrained in time but is between 970 and 1750 BP, and was about 6 M_{W}. From the offset of dated river terraces a displacement of 23 m (75 ft) has been estimated along the Wairau Fault since about 5610 years BP. Trenching studies along the trace of the Wairau Fault have identified four dateable slip events within this interval, the age of latest event now on redating and further trench work at two other locations falls in the range 1930 to 2110 BP and was about 7.4 M_{W}. The average recurrence interval for surface disrupting earthquakes along the land portion of the fault is about 1000 years. The estimated average slip for each land event is about 6 m (20 ft) and the maximum is 10 m (33 ft). However it is noted that the offshore fault record extends back 18,000 years and this has a longer recurrence interval of 2200 years, possibly because the fault has been more active in the last 6000 years.

== Seismic hazard ==
The recurrence interval of slip events estimated for the fault combined with the estimated time since the last event suggest "that the Wairau Fault is nearing the end of its interseismic period". The current estimated seismic hazard from the Wairau Fault is considered to be relatively high with a current slip rate of up to 3.5 mm (0.14 in)/year to accommodate. The magnitude of such an earthquake could be up to 7.7 M_{W}. The fault runs alongside State Highway 63 to its end at the township of Renwick and presumably with full rupture would be disruptive to the town of Blenheim which is within 5 km (3.1 mi) of the fault and the port facilities of Picton less than 20 km (12 mi) away.
