= Hope Fault =

Active fault in New Zealand

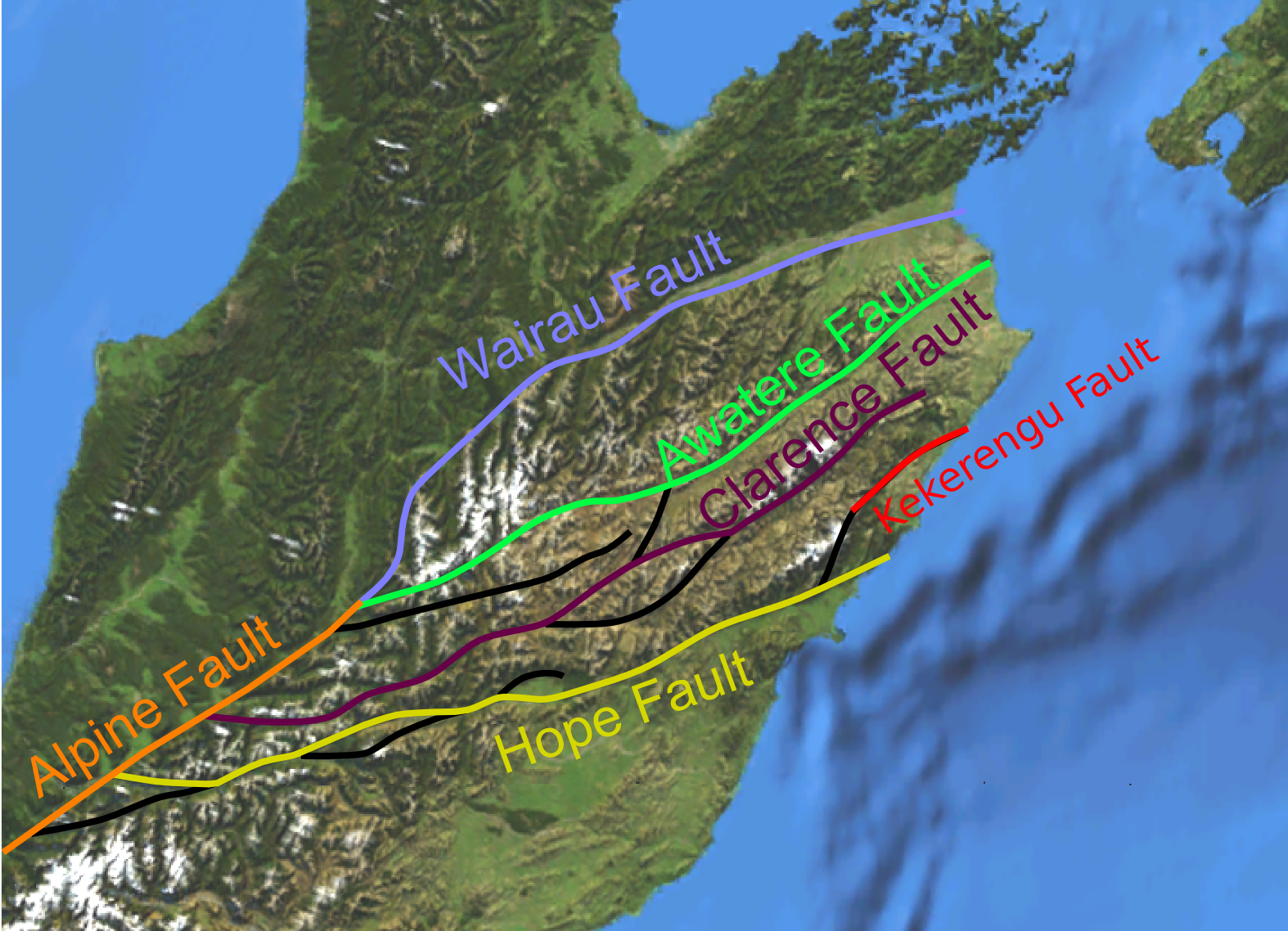
- Map of the Marlborough Fault System

- Location of the fault in New Zealand
- Etymology: Hope
- Coordinates: 42°45′S 173°04′E
- Country: New Zealand
- Region: South Island
- State: Canterbury
- Cities: Kaikōura

Characteristics
- Range: Southern Alps
- Part of: Marlborough fault system
- Segments: Kelly, Hurunui, Hope River, Conway & Seaward segments
- Length: 243 km (151 mi)
- Strike: ~073 (WSW-ENE)
- Displacement: 8.1–23 mm (0.32–0.91 in)/yr

Tectonics
- Plate: Indo-Australian, Pacific
- Status: Active
- Earthquakes: 1888, 2016
- Type: Strike-slip fault
- Movement: Dextral
- Age: Pleistocene-Holocene
- Orogeny: Kaikoura
- New Zealand geology database (includes faults)

The Hope Fault is an active dextral (right lateral) strike-slip fault in the northeastern part of South Island, New Zealand. It forms part of the Marlborough fault system, which accommodates the transfer of displacement along the oblique convergent boundary between the Indo-Australian plate and Pacific plate, from the transform Alpine Fault to the Hikurangi Trough subduction zone.

== Extent ==
The Hope Fault branches off from the Alpine Fault south of Hokitika and then runs in a nearly straight line for about 230 kilometres (140 mi) to the east coast of South Island just north of Kaikōura, with an offshore continuation of at least 13 kilometres (8.1 mi). It consists of several segments, from the southwest end, the Kelly Fault, then the Hurunui, Hope River, Conway and Seaward segments. It takes its name from the Hope River, which follows the trace of much of the Hope River segment.

=== Kelly Fault segment ===
The junction between the Hope fault and the Alpine Fault is complex. The Kelly Fault forms a major splay of the Hope Fault from just west of Harper Pass; it splays again to the west into the Newton and Hura faults. From repeat GPS surveying on the region near Arthur's Pass, the Kelly Fault marks a sharp reduction in velocities to the northwest of the Kelly and Hura faults.

=== Hurunui segment ===
This 42 kilometres (26 mi) long segment runs from Harper pass to the junction of the Hope and Boyle rivers. The maximum slip-rate estimated from the offset of a stream is about 13 millimetres (0.51 in)/yr. A minimum slip-rate has also been estimated from offset of channels in a late Holocene alluvial fan complex of 8.1 to 11.0 millimetres (0.32 to 0.43 in)/yr. The average recurrence interval for earthquake slip events on this segment is 310–490 yr.

=== Hope River segment ===
The Hope River segment runs about 30 kilometres (19 mi) from the confluence of the Boyle and Hope rivers as far as the Hanmer Basin. From the offset of dated river terraces, a late Holocene horizontal slip-rate of about 10 millimetres (0.39 in)/yr and a vertical slip-rate of about 0.6 mm/yr have been calculated for this segment. The displacement is thought to have occurred by repeated slips which, if similar to that which caused the 1888 earthquake, indicate a return period of about 140 years.

=== Conway segment ===
The Conway segment is the longest and straightest of the segments with a strike of about N73°E. It extends 70 kilometres (43 mi) from the eastern part of the Hanmer Basin to just west of the junction with the Jordan Thrust near Kowhai River. The slip-rate for this segment, estimated from offset alluvial features, is about 23 mm/yr. The fault dips steeply to the northwest at about 70° and forms the southern termination of the Seaward Kaikōura, Hawk and Amuri ranges. This topography is a result of the significant component of reverse displacement on this fault zone. An average recurrence interval of 180–310 yr has been calculated for earthquakes along this segment.

=== Seaward segment ===
The Seaward segment extends from near the Kowhai River to the coast and has been recognised on the continental shelf from seismic reflection data, extending for at least another 13 kilometres (8.1 mi). Part of this segment ruptured in the 2016 Kaikōura earthquake.

=== Hanmer Basin ===
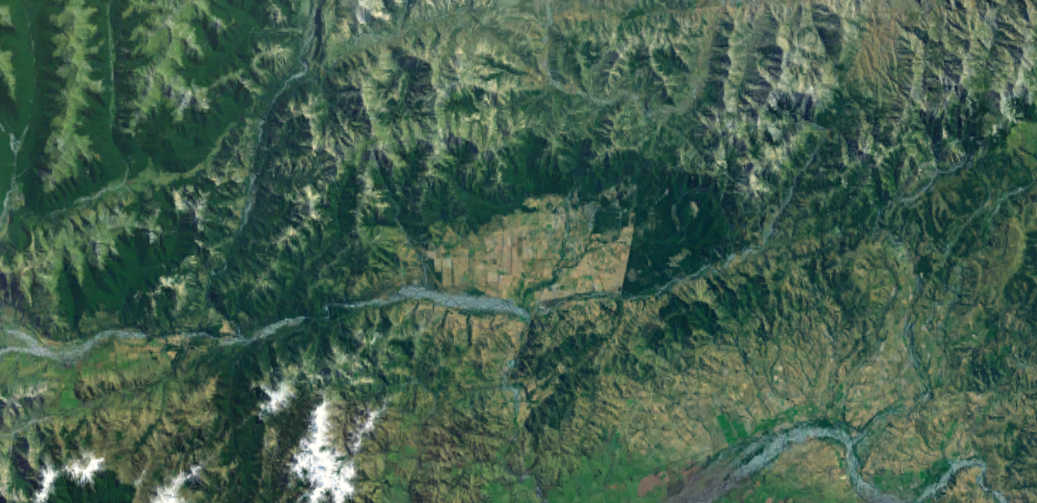
Satellite photograph of the Hanmer Basin, the area of agricultural land in the centre of the picture

Hanmer Basin is a small (10 x 20 km) pull-apart basin formed at the overlap between the Hope River and Conway segments of the Hope Fault. The right-stepping geometry of the offset between the two segments has caused local extension to occur and a basin to form. The hot springs of Hanmer Springs are one of the results of the basin formation. Other smaller basins of similar type have formed at minor offsets along the Hope River segment. The basin began to form in the Pleistocene and contains more than 1000 m of sedimentary fill in the main depocenter. The eastern end of the basin is currently being deformed by transpression associated with the southwestern end of the Conway segment. The destruction of the basin at its eastern end is matched by transtensional deformation at the western end that continues to enlarge the basin, giving rise to a roughly steady-state geometry. The basin fill is being constantly reworked as it is uplifted at the basin's eastern end and redeposited to the west.

== History ==
The oldest fill in the Hanmer Basin is Pleistocene in age, which constrains the development of the Hope Fault to that period.

The most recent earthquake on the Hope Fault was the 2016 Kaikōura earthquake, which ruptured part of the Seaward segment.

The previous earthquake was the 1888 North Canterbury earthquake, which ruptured the whole of the Hope River segment. Alexander McKay, a geologist working for the New Zealand geological survey, observed horizontal offsets in farm fences of between 1.5 and 2.6 metres along the fault. He was the first to associate a strike-slip displacement with an earthquake. The longest segment, the Conway segment, shows evidence of past earthquakes, although none have been recorded since European settlement in about 1850. Investigations show that at least three events have occurred, the most recent of which is dated to between 1720 and 1840.

== Seismic hazard ==
All segments of the Hope Fault are likely to experience future earthquakes, the largest such events, a possible magnitude 7.5, would be expected from the Conway segment or the Jordan Thrust.
