= Virginia Toy =

New Zealand geologist

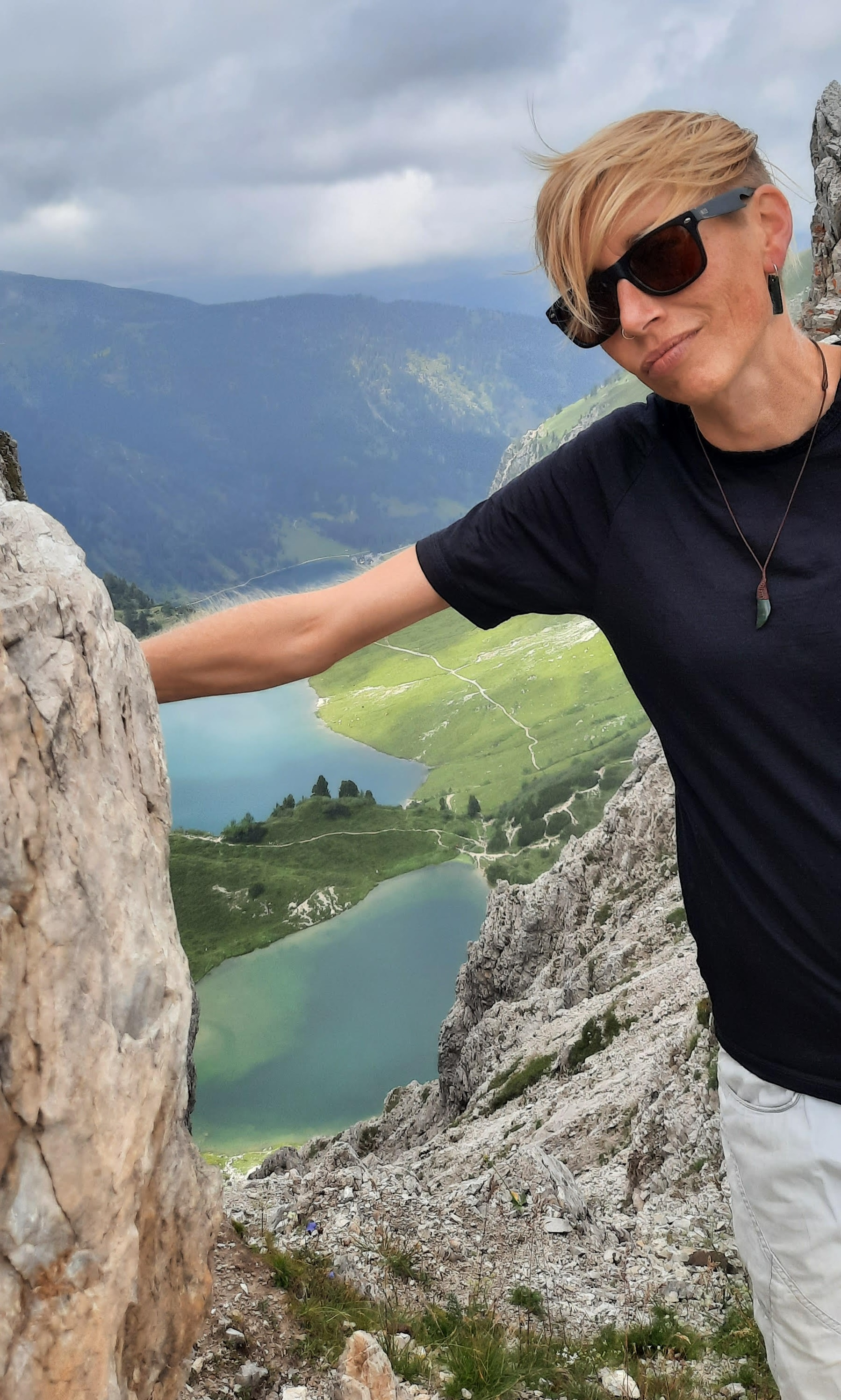
- Toy in 2021
- Born: Virginia Gail Toy; 1979 (age 46–47); Auckland, New Zealand
- Education: BSc MSc (Auckland); MPhil (ANU); PhD (Otago)
- Scientific career
- Fields: Structural Geology
- Workplaces: University of Mainz
- Thesis: Rheology of the Alpine Fault Mylonite Zone: deformation processes at and below the base of the seismogenic zone in a major plate boundary structure (2008)
- Doctoral advisor: Richard Norris, Alan Cooper, Richard H. Sibson

Virginia Gail Toy (born 1979) is a New Zealand geologist who studies fault zones and earthquakes in New Zealand, Japan and Ecuador. She is one of the leaders of the Deep Fault Drilling Project of New Zealand's Alpine Fault, and was a research scientist on the Japan Trench Fast Drilling Project. She then worked as a research associate professor in geology and associate dean (international) in the Division of Sciences at the University of Otago. Toy currently works as a Professor at the University of Mainz.

== Early life and education ==
Toy grew up on Auckland's North Shore and gained her Bachelor of Science then Master of Science (with honours) in geology from Auckland University. She then gained a Master of Philosophy in Earth Sciences from the Australian National University and a Doctor of Philosophy in geology from the University of Otago in 2008. Her PhD was on the (micro)structural geology of New Zealand's Alpine Fault.

== Career and impact ==
In 2016, Toy was awarded a Rutherford Discovery Fellowship by the Royal Society for her research entitled: 'Weaving the Earth's Weak Seams: Manifestations and mechanical consequences of rock fabric evolution in active faults and shear zones'.

In 2017, Toy co-published in Nature that they had discovered "extreme" hydrothermal activity beneath Whataroa, a small township on the Alpine Fault, which "could be commercially very significant" and possibly globally unique.

Toy also worked on building stability during earthquakes in Ecuador, using computer modelling to determine the relationship between rock type and building damage. She has been used numerous times by New Zealand media as a geological expert, on the Kaikōura earthquake, tsunami risk, predicting the next earthquake on the Alpine Fault and the misreporting of science in the media. She has also been used as a popular science presenter in the book Terrain: Travels Through a Deep Landscape and the TV show Beneath New Zealand.
