= Marlborough fault system =

Active fault system in New Zealand

- Marlborough tectonic domain
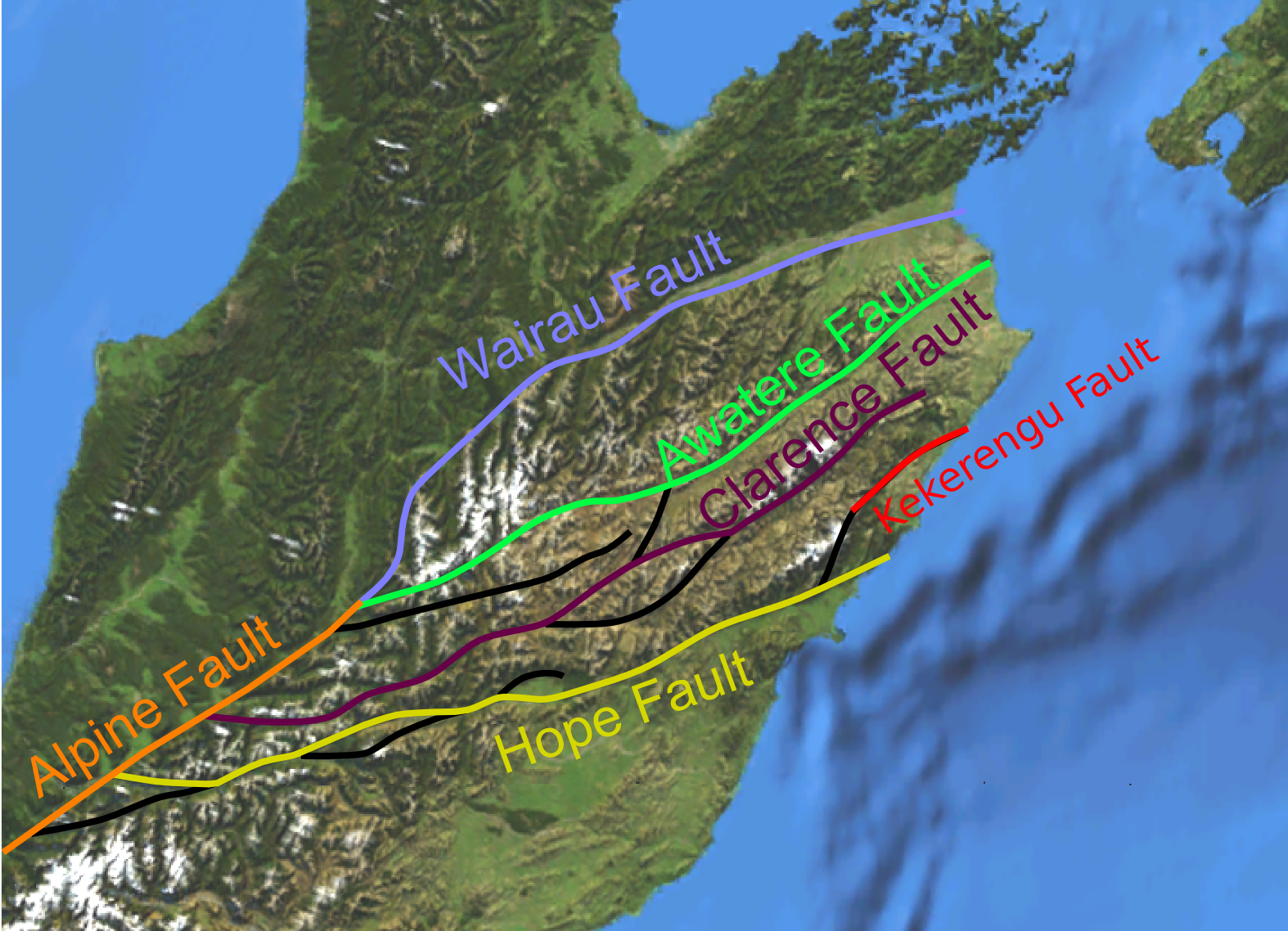
- Map of the Marlborough fault system
- Etymology: Marlborough
- Country: New Zealand
- Region: Marlborough

Characteristics
- Displacement: Total strike-slip across system is up to 48 mm (1.9 in)/year.

Tectonics
- Plate: Indo-Australian, Pacific
- Status: Active
- Earthquakes: 7.8 M_{w} 2016 Kaikōura earthquake
- Type: Strike-slip faults
- Movement: Dextral/convergent, east side up
- Age: Albian-Meghalayan 105–0 Ma
- Orogeny: Kaikōura
- New Zealand geology database (includes faults)

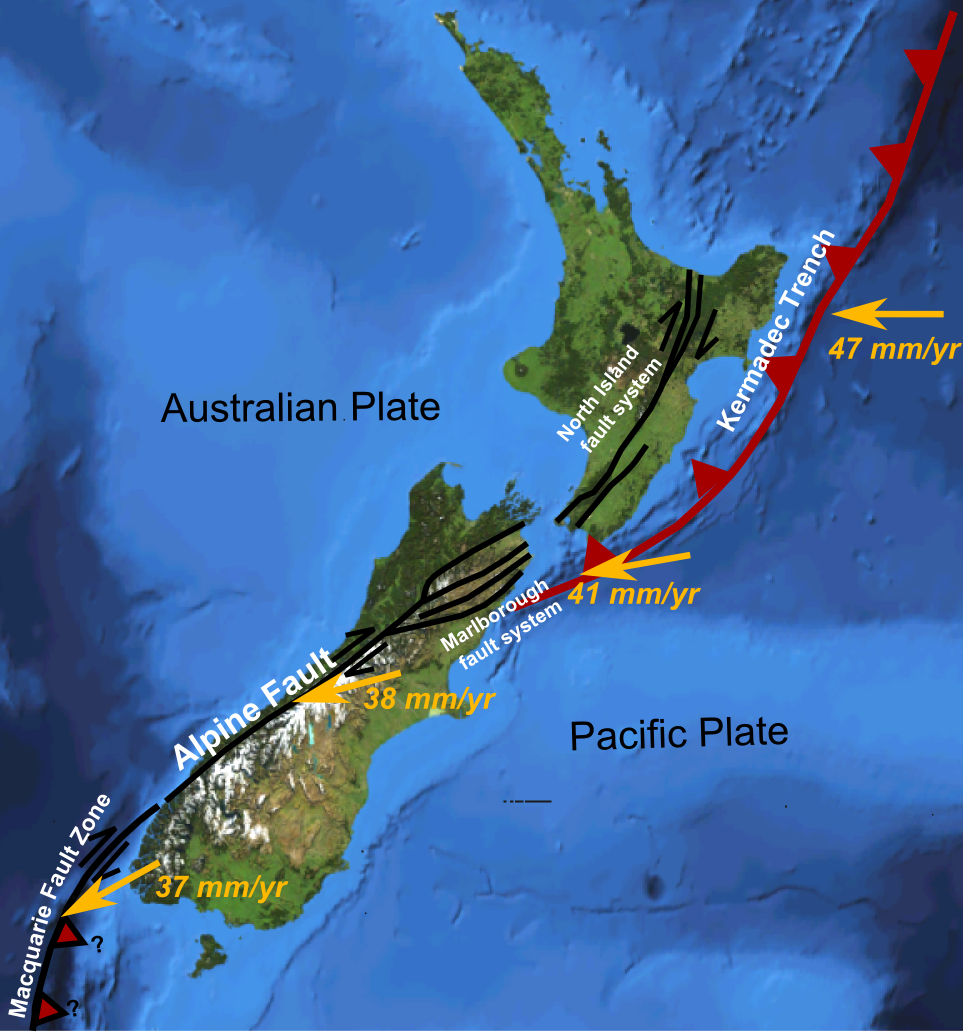
Major active fault zones of New Zealand showing variation in displacement vector of Pacific plate relative to Australian plate along the boundary

The Marlborough fault system (also known as Marlborough tectonic domain) is a set of four large dextral strike-slip faults and other related structures in the northern part of the South Island, New Zealand, which transfer displacement between the mainly transform plate boundary of the Alpine fault and the mainly destructive boundary of the Kermadec Trench, and together form the boundary between the Australian and Pacific plates.

== Geometry ==
The Marlborough fault system consists of four main dominantly strike-slip fault strands, which together carry almost all of the displacement associated with the plate boundary. Estimates of the rate of current displacement for total strike-slip across the system are between 39 mm (1.5 in)/year to 48 mm (1.9 in)/year. This has meant up to 450 m (1,480 ft) of relative plate motion in less than 14,000 years. Other smaller faults form as splays of these main faults or accommodate deformation of the crust between them, such as the Newton and Hura Faults at the western end of the Hope Fault and the Jordan Thrust that formed the Seaward Kaikōura Range. The dextral strike-slip across this zone has also involved clockwise rotation of the intervening fault blocks of about 20° since the early Pliocene. The Hope Fault is the southern limit of the Marlborough fault system and faults to the south of it, even quite close by, are regarded as part of the Northern Canterbury domain.

== Development ==
It appears from the latest studies of the rupture complexity of the 2016 Kaikōura earthquake that the myriad of faults associated with deformation episodes over the past 100 million years are important to propagation of rupture in large events in the southern part of the Marlborough fault system as due to their reorientation they act as reactivated interconnections between the current major now dominant strike-slip faults. Retrospective studies of the other large historic events in the Marlborough fault system show that this is not typical in the northeast or central parts of the system. Such faults might include implicate reverse faults from a Gondwana subduction zone before 100 million years ago, but more definitely appear to relate to both low and high angle normal faults associated with Gondwana breakup and opening of the Tasman Sea between 105 and 60 million years ago and the reverse faults associated with the uplift of the Inland Kaikōura Mountains between 35 million to 25 million years ago due to the start of convergence of the current plate boundary were created.

Further analysis shows that the mutual plate movement has been all effectively accommodated in the region itself, over the last 14,000 odd years by ruptures in size, space and time of the four main fault strands. Modelling the measured Hope, Clarence, Awatere and Wairau fault displacements show that they keep up, over periods of less than a 1000 years and a few tens of metres with the plate movement. This was the first proof of a common assumption that had been made by some seismologists of the processes in tectonic related earthquake systems, as opposed to individual faults.

An ancestral fault system formed between 25 and 8 million years ago with the full development of the Hikurangi subduction margin which was associated with marked vertical axis rotations. There was progressive development of the modern Marlborough fault system after this from the north towards the south during the early Pliocene, with the Hope Fault complex forming no more than 2 million years ago and current formation to the south of the Hope Fault of a new fault complex, in response to a change in plate motions. This new zone in Canterbury has been termed the Porters Pass–Amberley Fault Zone. The new plate vector is significantly oblique to the Alpine Fault, causing an increased amount of convergence. A set of strike-slip faults formed to accommodate this change by taking up most of the strike-slip component.

== Faults ==
There are four main fault strands, being the Hope, Clarence, Awatere and Wairau faults, although many other smaller faults, of either strike-slip or thrust type are known.

=== Main faults ===
==== Hope Fault ====
The Hope Fault forms the southernmost part of the Marlborough fault system. The estimated slip-rate during the Holocene is 0.2–0.25 cm/year (0.079–0.098 in/year), just over half of the plate boundary displacement. At its northeastern end it links into the Jordan Thrust and most of the displacement is transferred onto that structure. It takes its name from the Hope River, which runs along one of the central fault segments. The Kekerengu Fault and Jordan Thrust are closely associated with the Hope Fault. It did not undergo significant rupture in the 2016 Kaikōura earthquake although there was minor motion on its seaward aspects, and some off fault uplift to its south except near the Northern Canterbury domain Conway-Charwell Fault which is parallel, and did rupture only a few hundreds of metres away. After the main shock sequence there were aftershocks clustered to its south in the region of the Conway-Charwell Fault.

==== Clarence Fault ====
The Clarence Fault runs from close to the Alpine Fault to about 10 km (6.2 mi) west of Ward, where it appears to terminate abruptly. A Holocene slip-rate of 0.35–0.5 cm/year (0.14–0.20 in/year) is estimated for this fault. At the surface the displacement appears to be nearly pure horizontal, but continuous uplift of the neighbouring Inner Kaikōura Range over the same period, suggests that some of the dip-slip component thought to be present at depth on the fault zone is transferred onto thrust or reverse faults under the range. An extra 10° of clockwise rotation has been recognised within the block that lies northeast of the tip of the Clarence fault. It takes its name from the Waiau Toa / Clarence River, which follows the fault trace in the northeastern section of the fault.

==== Awatere Fault ====
It is formed of two main segments; the Molesworth section to the southwest and the Eastern section to the northeast. The estimated recent slip-rate for the Molesworth section is 0.44 cm/year (0.17 in/year). It takes its name from the Awatere River whose valley follows the fault trace along some of its length.

==== Wairau Fault ====
The Wairau Fault is sometimes regarded as a direct continuation of the Alpine Fault and may be referred to as the Alpine-Wairau Fault. It takes its name from the Wairau River, which follows the fault trace for most of its length. It has an estimated slip-rate of 0.3–0.5 cm/year (0.12–0.20 in/year).

=== Smaller Faults ===
==== Kekerengu Fault ====
It is closely associated with the Hope Fault and Jordan Thrust at its south-easternmost edge and likely joins with the Clarence Fault to form the Wairarapa Fault offshore in Cook Strait. Before joining with the Clarence Fault, The offshore segment of the Kekerengu Fault is known as the Needles Fault. In the 7.8 (M_{w}) 2016 Kaikōura earthquake major rupture of both the Kekerengu Fault for 27 km (17 mi), with maximum displacement 12.0 m (39.4 ft) ± 0.7 m (2 ft 4 in) and the Needles Fault for 30 km (19 mi)) occurred.

==== Elliott Fault ====
The dextral Elliott Fault branches from the central portion of the Clarence Fault and then rejoins it. The Acheron and Dillon sinsteral faults also connect these two faults.

==== Kelly Fault ====
The Kelly Fault forms a major fork of the Hope Fault from just west of Harper Pass; it forks again to the west into the Newton and Hura faults just before connecting to the Alpine Fault.

==== Jordan Thrust ====
The Jordan Thrust is a reverse fault that connects the southern end of the Kekerengu Fault to the Seaward Segment of the Hope Fault. It ruptured during the 7.8 (M_{w}) 2016 Kaikōura earthquake with a component of dextral-normal displacement in contrast to its long-term reverse motion. This also resulted in major uplift to its coastal south east side as it approached the Papatea Fault.

==== Fidget Fault ====
The dextral Fidget Fault commences to the south of the Waiau Toa / Clarence River and runs along its valley initially before striking east to the south of the hill of Mackintosh Knob and intercepting the Jordan Thrust near the coast where the Jordan Thrust transitions to the Kekerengu Fault. Its eastern portion ruptured in the 2016 Kaikōura earthquake with some increased vertical displacement upwards to its north in the Seaward Kaikōura Range. After the 2016 Kaikōura earthquake there was an aftershock cluster to its south.

==== Papatea Fault ====
The Papatea Fault runs from the Jordan Thrust south east to Waipapa Bay where it historically was known to have a deep southeast plunge suggesting past dextral motion. In the 7.8 (M_{w}) 2016 Kaikōura earthquake it had a sinistral component however and aftershocks grouped along its length and towards Kaikōura. The size of the displacements were marked and second only to those along the Kekerengu Fault in this earthquake. There was up to 7.3 m (24 ft) of left-lateral displacement and 9 m (30 ft) of west side up vertical slip.

==== Snowgrass Creek Fault ====
The Snowgrass Creek Fault was identified to be an active subsurface fault zone by optical displacement analysis (any surface rupture might be difficult to recognise due to mountainous location) and was associated with a prominent group of aftershocks after 2016 Kaikoura earthquake. It extends between the Kekerengu and Clarence faults northwest of Clarence. It trends northeast–southwest ( at about 210°) with displacement in this earthquake being mainly right lateral and it may lie within the hanging wall of a deeper fault structure.

==== Barefell Pass Fault ====
This is an active dextral fault between the Clarence and Awatere faults. It had a 4.8 ± 1.2 m dextral displacement in the 1848 Marlborough earthquake of the Awatere Fault.

==== Fowlers Fault ====
This is an active dextral fault that arises as a splay off the Alpine Fault south of where the Wairau Fault splays off, just south of the Blue Grey River and follows initially to the east its valley. The surface trace terminates to the east just beyond the Chimmney Stream before the Acheron River. There has been more recent upper crustal microseismicity in this fault than in the Clarence Fault to its south.

== Seismicity ==
All parts of the Marlborough fault system are currently seismically active. Historical earthquakes (since European settlement) have occurred on both the Hope and Awatere Faults and on the smaller Poulter Fault. Studies of the geomorphology and the use of trenching across fault strands, has identified many earthquakes that occurred during the Holocene on many parts of the fault system. The Hope Fault, which has the fastest slip rate is characterised by the shortest recurrence interval. The complexity of the 7.8 M_{w} 2016 Kaikōura earthquake completely redefined the understanding of the dynamics of the seismicity in the southern section of the fault system. As the recent movements of all the main faults is now understood, future forecasting of major earthquakes in the area may improve.

== See also ==
- 1848 Marlborough earthquake
- 2013 Seddon earthquake
- 2013 Lake Grassmere earthquake
- 2016 Kaikōura earthquake
- List of earthquakes in New Zealand
