= Awatere Fault =

Seismic fault in New Zealand

- Location: South Island, New Zealand
- Country: New Zealand

Characteristics
- Segments: 2; Molesworth and Eastern
- Length: 175 km (109 mi)

Tectonics
- Plate: Australian Plate, Pacific Plate
- Status: Active
- Earthquakes: 1848 Marlborough earthquake
- Type: dextral strike-slip fault
- New Zealand geology database (includes faults)

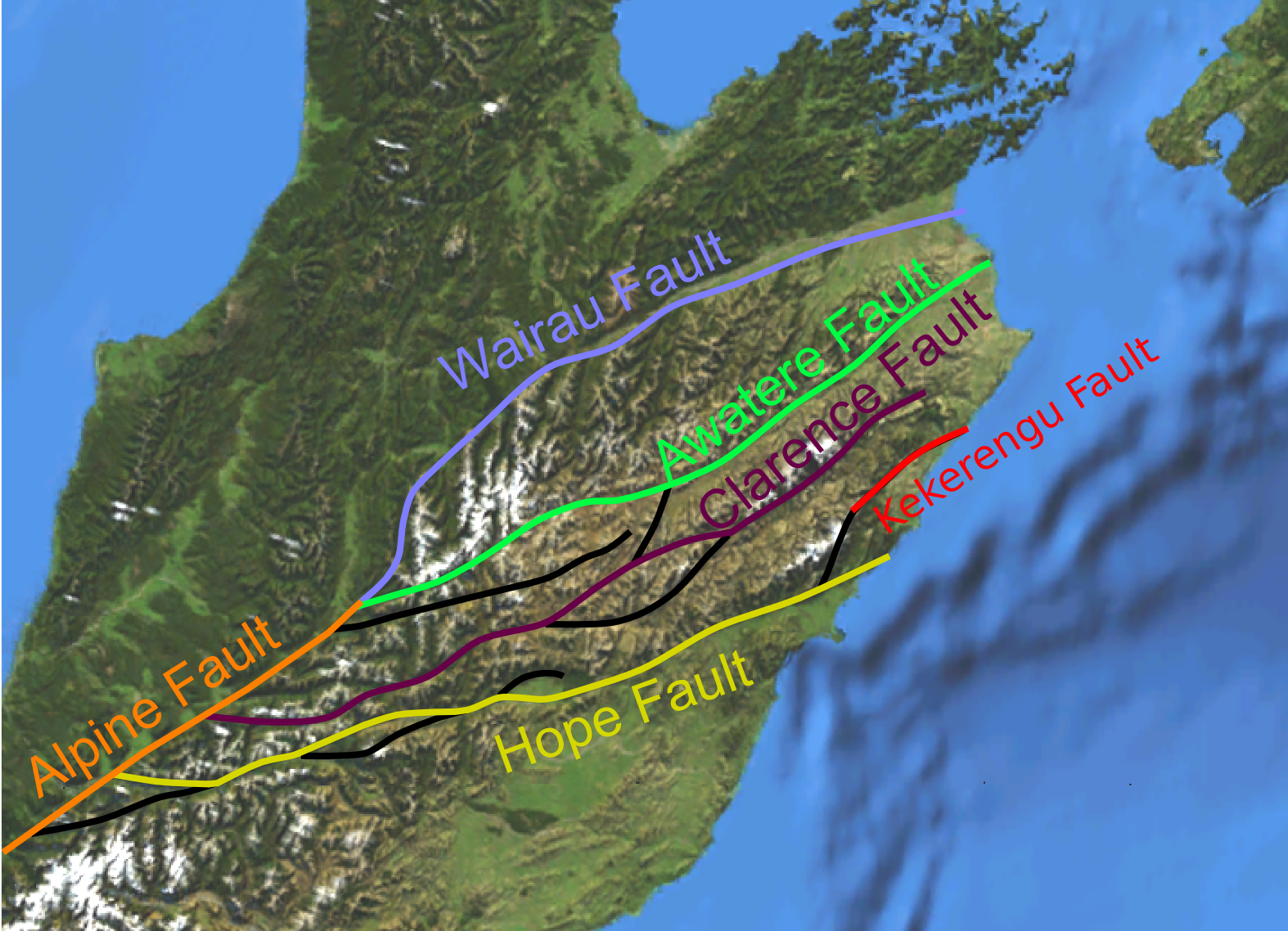
Map of the Marlborough Fault System

The Awatere Fault is an active dextral (right lateral) strike-slip fault in the northeastern part of South Island, New Zealand. It forms part of the Marlborough fault system, which accommodates the transfer of displacement along the oblique convergent boundary between the Indo-Australian plate and Pacific plate, from the transform Alpine Fault to the Hikurangi Trough subduction zone. The 1848 Marlborough earthquake was caused by rupture of the whole of the eastern section of the Awatere Fault. The 175 km (109 mi) long Awatere Fault is formed of two main segments; the Molesworth section to the southwest and the Eastern section to the northeast. A further strand links the southwestern end of the Eastern section to the Clarence Fault, passing through Barefell Pass.

== Molesworth section ==
The Molesworth segment of the Awatere Fault runs from close to the junction between the Alpine and Wairau Faults near Lake Tennyson, to near Molesworth Station in the northeast. It is about 55 km (34 mi) in length and consists of several smaller segments. This section has an overall strike of N75–80°E, giving local zones of transtension at some of the segment boundaries, such as at Isolated Flat.

== Eastern section ==
The Eastern section of the fault runs from Molesworth Station to the coast, near White Bluffs, without significant segmentation. Shallow-crust seismic studies in Cook Strait extend the fault about 20 km (12 mi) beyond White Bluffs into Cook Strait. The Awatere River, occupying the Awatere Valley, follows the trace of much of the eastern section of the fault, giving its name to the whole structure.

== Recent seismicity ==
The Molesworth section appears to have moved twice since about 3000 years ago, in events with slip values of about 6–7 m (20–23 ft). Trenching at Saxton River at the eastern end of the Molesworth section suggests 8 ruptures since about 6,300 years ago, with an estimated mean recurrence of about 800 years. Evidence from the eastern section of the fault suggests that there were 9–10 earthquakes in the period from 8610 BP to AD 1848. This gives a mean recurrence interval of 820–950 years. In 1848 a minimum 110 km (68 mi) length section of the fault ruptured, causing an earthquake of an estimated magnitude of about 7.5 M_{w}. It is possible that up to 140 km (87 mi) of the fault ruptured. The rupture appears to have bypassed the Molesworth section of the fault, continuing on the southern strand through Barefell Pass.

=== Seismic hazard ===
Seismic hazard on the Eastern section is considered low, with only about 150 years since the last major earthquake on that section and an estimated recurrence interval of 600–2500 years.
