= Boyle River (New Zealand) =

Coordinates: 42°36′S 172°24′E

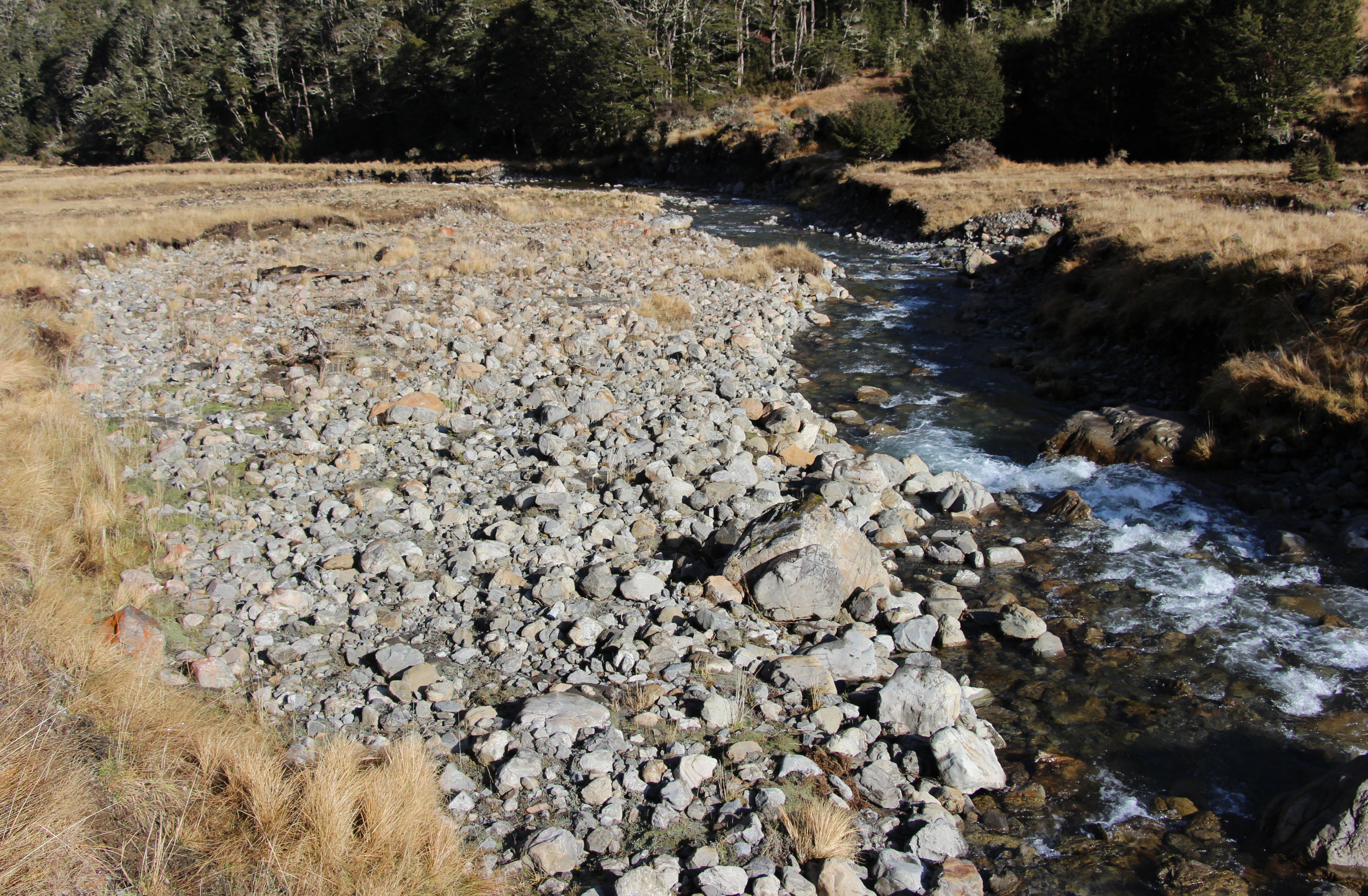

Location
- Country: New Zealand

Physical characteristics
- Source
  - location: Opera Range
- Mouth
  - location: Hope River
- Length: 37 km (23 mi)

The Boyle River is a river of New Zealand. A tributary of the Hope River, it flows south, then west before curving round to the southeast and then joining with the Hope. State Highway 7 follows the course of the river for some distance south of the Lewis Pass; the pass itself is located less than five kilometres to the west of the river's source. The upper reaches of the river form a deep valley between the Opera Range and the Libretto Range.

== Climate ==
Climate data for Boyle River Lodge, elevation 600 m (2,000 ft), (1991–2020 normals, 1982–present)
Month	Jan	Feb	Mar	Apr	May	Jun	Jul	Aug	Sep	Oct	Nov	Dec	Year
Record high °C (°F)	35.0 (95.0)	35.0 (95.0)	31.0 (87.8)	27.9 (82.2)	27.6 (81.7)	18.1 (64.6)	17.0 (62.6)	23.4 (74.1)	22.5 (72.5)	27.3 (81.1)	30.5 (86.9)	31.5 (88.7)	35.0 (95.0)
Mean maximum °C (°F)	30.5 (86.9)	29.9 (85.8)	27.2 (81.0)	22.8 (73.0)	19.3 (66.7)	14.5 (58.1)	13.5 (56.3)	16.6 (61.9)	19.8 (67.6)	23.5 (74.3)	25.7 (78.3)	28.5 (83.3)	31.5 (88.7)
Mean daily maximum °C (°F)	22.6 (72.7)	22.8 (73.0)	20.1 (68.2)	16.2 (61.2)	12.5 (54.5)	9.2 (48.6)	8.7 (47.7)	10.8 (51.4)	13.4 (56.1)	15.6 (60.1)	17.9 (64.2)	20.5 (68.9)	15.9 (60.6)
Daily mean °C (°F)	15.8 (60.4)	15.6 (60.1)	13.4 (56.1)	10.1 (50.2)	7.2 (45.0)	4.4 (39.9)	3.7 (38.7)	5.4 (41.7)	7.7 (45.9)	9.6 (49.3)	11.6 (52.9)	14.1 (57.4)	9.9 (49.8)
Mean daily minimum °C (°F)	9.0 (48.2)	8.5 (47.3)	6.7 (44.1)	4.0 (39.2)	1.9 (35.4)	−0.4 (31.3)	−1.2 (29.8)	0.0 (32.0)	2.1 (35.8)	3.6 (38.5)	5.2 (41.4)	7.7 (45.9)	3.9 (39.1)
Mean minimum °C (°F)	2.4 (36.3)	1.5 (34.7)	−0.2 (31.6)	−1.9 (28.6)	−4.6 (23.7)	−6.1 (21.0)	−7.0 (19.4)	−5.9 (21.4)	−4.8 (23.4)	−2.8 (27.0)	−0.9 (30.4)	1.5 (34.7)	−7.7 (18.1)
Record low °C (°F)	−0.1 (31.8)	−3.8 (25.2)	−2.2 (28.0)	−4.2 (24.4)	−8.5 (16.7)	−11.4 (11.5)	−9.7 (14.5)	−9.0 (15.8)	−9.7 (14.5)	−6.0 (21.2)	−3.2 (26.2)	−5.0 (23.0)	−11.4 (11.5)
Average rainfall mm (inches)	142.5 (5.61)	106.4 (4.19)	128.0 (5.04)	150.5 (5.93)	189.9 (7.48)	183.3 (7.22)	164.5 (6.48)	161.2 (6.35)	195.6 (7.70)	227.9 (8.97)	191.8 (7.55)	179.9 (7.08)	2,021.5 (79.6)
Source: NIWA

== See also ==
- List of rivers of New Zealand
