= Richard H. Sibson =

New Zealand geologist

- Born: 1945 (age 80–81)
- Occupation: Professor Emeritus

Academic work
- Notable students: Virginia Toy

Richard Hugh Sibson FRS (born 1945) is a New Zealand structural geologist and emeritus professor at the University of Otago, who has received numerous honors and awards for his work in the field of earthquake research. He has caused a 'fundamental shift' in the interpretation of the relationship between earthquakes and fault zone geology and on the origin of fault-hosted mineral deposits.

== Academic career ==
Richard Sibson is the son of ornithologist Richard B. Sibson (1911–1994). From 1959 to 1963 he attended King's College in Auckland. Sibson's subsequent decision to study geology was significantly influenced by his uncle, the paleontologist and naturalist Sir Charles Fleming, who suggested this subject to him. In 1968, he gained his BSc at the University of Auckland, 1970, and MSc at Imperial College London. Where in 1977 he also received his PhD. From 1982 to 1990 he worked at the Institute for Crustal Studies and Department of Geological Sciences, University of California, Santa Barbara. From 1990 to 2009 he was a professor at the University of Otago. He is associate professor of the University of Canterbury in Christchurch. In 2005, he co-founded the Institute of Earth Science and Engineering at the University of Auckland. Sibson's notable students include Virginia Toy.

== Research ==
Sibson studied structural geology at Imperial College under John G. Ramsay, Neville J. Price and Ernie Rutter. His particular interest was in the study of the structure and mechanics of fault zones of the Earth's crust and their relationship to earthquakes. His doctoral thesis dealt with pseudotachylites of the Outer Hebrides, he proved that these rocks are due to earthquake events, as is currently accepted. Sibson studied rock mechanics and rock deformation, and attempted to derive geological information from seismic and seismological measurements. From 1981 he worked in the USGS earthquake program in Menlo Park, later in the Archaikum of Canada he examined the influence of fluids (gases and liquids) on the formation and the course of earthquakes and the formation of ore deposits in fault zones due to hydrothermal processes. Sibson has been involved in public education about the risk posed by New Zealand's numerous active faults particularly the Alpine Fault.

== Honors and prizes ==
- Fellow of the Royal Society of New Zealand
- 2003 Fellow of the Royal Society
- 2006 Fellow of the American Association for the Advancement of Science
- 2010 Wollaston Medal of the Geological Society of London
- 2010 Distinguished Alumni Award from the University of Auckland
