= Clarence Fault =

Active fault in New Zealand

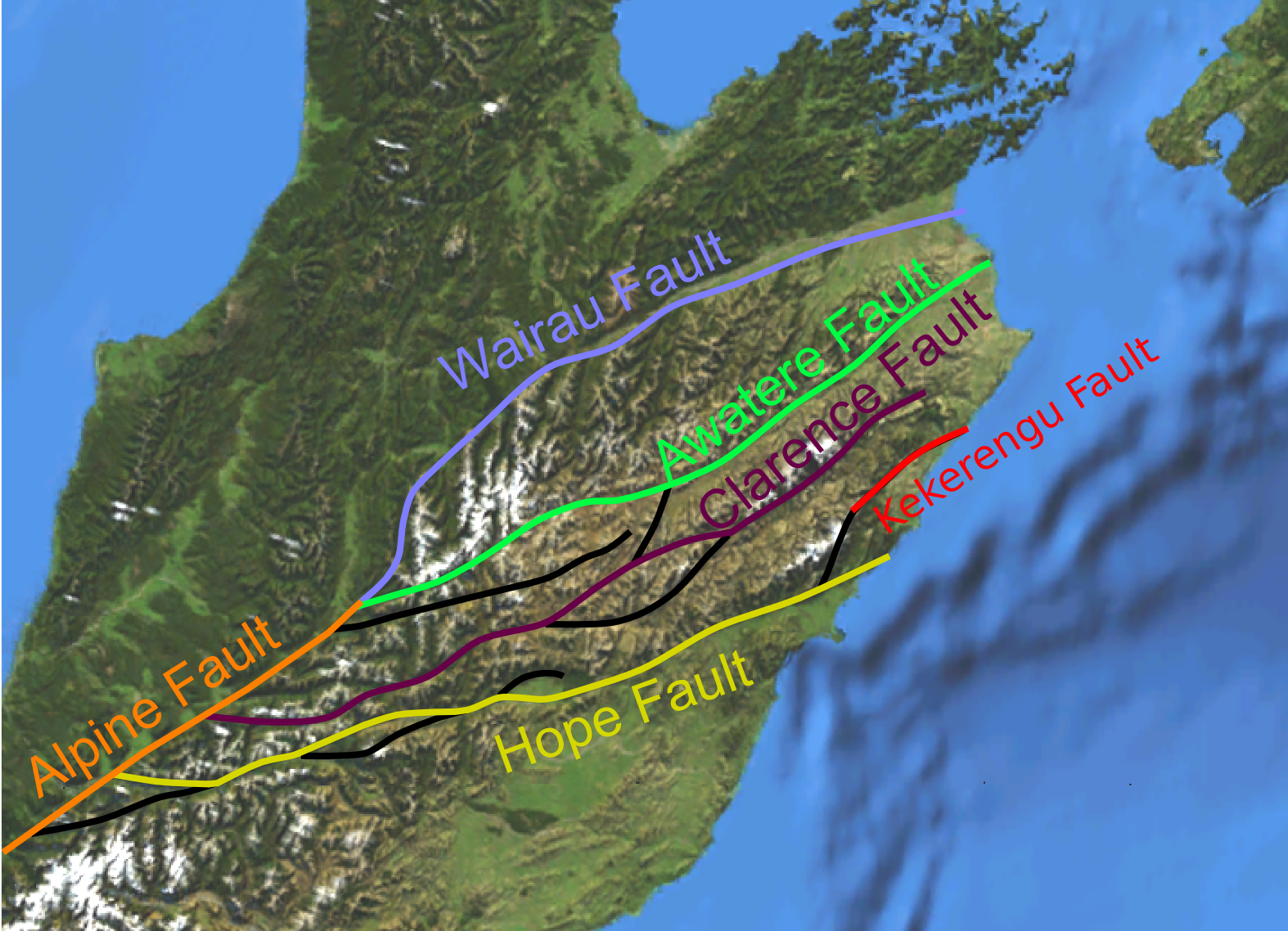
Map of the Marlborough Fault System

The Clarence Fault is an active dextral (right lateral) strike-slip fault in the northeastern part of South Island, New Zealand. It forms part of the Marlborough fault system, which accommodates the transfer of displacement along the oblique convergent boundary between the Indo-Australian plate and Pacific plate, from the transform Alpine Fault to the Hikurangi Trough subduction zone.

== Extent ==
The Clarence Fault extends from about 5 km south of Haupiri, close to the Alpine Fault to about 10 km west of Ward. This fault is the only member of the Marlborough Fault System to have neither a clear junction with the Alpine fault to the southwest nor a northeastward continuation to the coast. The southwestern part of the fault consists of many fault traces and has a transpressive "pop-up" geometry. To the northeast the strands merge to form a single fault trace in the middle of the Waiau Toa / Clarence River valley, from which the fault gets its name. At the surface the displacement on this continuous trace appears to be nearly pure horizontal, but continuous uplift of the neighbouring Inland Kaikōura Range over the same period, suggests that some of the dip-slip component thought to be present at depth on the fault zone is transferred onto thrust or reverse faults under the range. An extra 10° of clockwise rotation has been recognised within the block that lies northeast of the tip of the Clarence fault.

=== Elliott Fault ===
The Elliott Fault branches from the central portion of the Clarence Fault and then rejoins it. A recurrence interval for earthquakes along this fault is estimated to be 2000–3500 years.

== Recent seismicity ==
Measurements from the southwestern part of the fault suggest 76–80 m of dextral displacement since the Late Pleistocene, about 18,000 years ago. This gives an average slip rate of 3.6–4.4 mm/yr with an average slip of about 5 m for each event. In the northeastern part of the fault, the estimated slip-rate is somewhat higher, 4.7 mm/yr and the average slip also higher at about 7 m. A recurrence interval of about 1500 years has also been estimated for this part of the fault. The timing of the most recent earthquake on the northeastern fault segment is poorly constrained, but is likely to be in the range 950–2000 years ago.

== Seismic hazard ==
The likelihood of a significant earthquake happening on the Clarence Fault in the next 50–100 years is regarded as moderate to possibly high, although poorly constrained by the available data.
