= 2013 Lake Grassmere earthquake =

Severe earthquake in New Zealand

- Location within New Zealand
- UTC time: 2013-08-16 02:31:09
- ISC event: 604020963
- USGS-ANSS: ComCat
- Local date: 16 August 2013
- Local time: 14:31:05 NZST
- Magnitude: 6.6 M_{ww}
- Depth: 8 kilometres (5 mi)
- Epicentre: 41.73°S 174.15°E
- Areas affected: New Zealand
- Max. intensity: MMI VIII (Severe)
- Tsunami: None
- Casualties: 4 people injured

The 2013 Lake Grassmere earthquake was a magnitude 6.6 earthquake that occurred at 2:31:05 pm (NZST) on Friday 16 August 2013. The epicentre was located about 10 km south-east of Seddon, under Lake Grassmere, with a focal depth of 8 km. The earthquake caused significant land damage in the local area, with landslips blocking roads, including the main highway between Blenheim and Christchurch. Buildings in Seddon were damaged, with some being declared uninhabitable. The earthquake was widely felt in both the North and South Islands of New Zealand.

== Earthquake ==
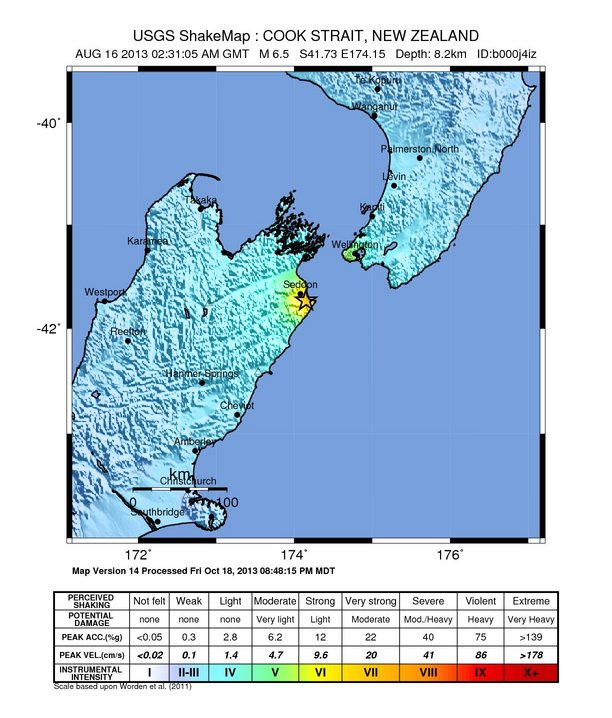
USGS Shakemap

This earthquake is considered to be a doublet of a magnitude 6.5 earthquake that occurred in Cook Strait on 21 July 2013 and is thought to have occurred on part of the same complex of faults. It started its own aftershock sequence, with several magnitude 5 and one magnitude 6 earthquakes occurring in the first few hours after the main shock.

=== Aftershocks ===
The earthquake generated a significant series of aftershocks, the largest of which had a magnitude of 6.0.

Below is a list of all aftershocks magnitudes 5.0 and above that occurred in the region between 16 August 2013 and 5 September 2013.

Date (NZST)	Time (NZST)	Magnitude (M_{W})	Magnitude (M_{b})	Magnitude (M_{L})	Epicentre	Depth
16 August 2013	2:31:05 pm	6.5	6.0	6.6	10 km southeast of Seddon	8 km
16 August 2013	2:37:27 pm		5.4	5.4	5 km southeast of Seddon	9 km
16 August 2013	2:45:27 pm	5.5	5.1	5.4	10 km southeast of Seddon	6 km
16 August 2013	2:56:27 pm		4.9	5.0	20 km east of Seddon	9 km
16 August 2013	3:09:08 pm	5.9	5.4	5.5	10 km south of Seddon	8 km
16 August 2013	3:21:31 pm		5.1	5.0	10 km south of Seddon	17 km
16 August 2013	3:51:35 pm	5.1	5.2	5.6	10 km east of Seddon	19 km
16 August 2013	5:31:16 pm	5.9	5.8	6.0	15 km east of Seddon	14 km
16 August 2013	5:56:10 pm			5.0	5 km northwest of Seddon	10 km
16 August 2013	5:57:52 pm		4.8	5.1	20 km east of Seddon	5 km
16 August 2013	6:42:40 pm			5.2	20 km east of Seddon	20 km
16 August 2013	6:55:58 pm		5.0	5.5	20 km east of Seddon	20 km
16 August 2013	8:38:54 pm	4.7	4.6	5.2	10 km southeast of Seddon	22 km
17 August 2013	4:13:20 pm		4.8	5.0	15 km southwest of Seddon	20 km
17 August 2013	8:58:39 pm	5.2	5.1	5.5	10 km south of Seddon	20 km
18 August 2013	4:07:52 am	4.6	4.4	5.0	5 km southeast of Seddon	20 km
5 September 2013	12:04:10 am		4.8	5.1	35 km northeast of Seddon	16 km

== Damage ==
In Wellington, the earthquake caused minor damage to buildings, breaking some display windows and cracking plaster. Many central city office workers left work early, and with all suburban train services cancelled for urgent track inspections, bus services overloaded and traffic gridlock occurred on major roads out of the city for a couple of hours. The City Council ordered the deconstruction of a 30-year-old lift shaft that had been damaged in a previous earthquake in July, after recently installed emergency seismic restraints failed. Several surrounding buildings in the fall zone were ordered to be evacuated. In the Wellington Region, 2,500 homes were left without power immediately after the earthquake. Most homes had power restored within an hour. Power was restored to 7,500 properties in Wellington City, Kāpiti Coast and Wainuiomata by 5 pm. Phone lines were also overwhelmed. State Highway 1 between Blenheim and Kaikōura was closed for the night after the earthquake. Wellington Airport temporarily closed to check for runway damage. In December 2013, the Insurance Council of New Zealand (ICNZ) claimed that the insurance loss of this earthquake amounted to be NZ$16.2 million (US$13.1 million).

=== Seddon ===
The quake caused substantial damage to a number of residential homes in the Seddon area. Eight houses were evacuated by The Marlborough District Council and another 11 allowed only restricted access.

=== Rest of New Zealand ===
The quake was felt as far north as Auckland and far south as Dunedin. Damage was reported in the Kāpiti Coast, Hutt Valley, Wellington, Blenheim, Ward and the rest of West Upper South Island.

== See also ==
- 1848 Marlborough earthquake
- 2013 Seddon earthquake
- 2016 Kaikōura earthquake
- List of earthquakes in 2013
- List of earthquakes in New Zealand
- Marlborough fault system
