= 1848 Marlborough earthquake =

Earthquake in New Zealand

- Location within New Zealand
- UTC time: 1848-10-16
- Local date: 16 October 1848
- Magnitude: M_{w} 7.5
- Depth: shallow
- Epicentre: 41°48′S 173°42′E
- Areas affected: New Zealand, Marlborough, South Island
- Casualties: 3 deaths

The 1848 Marlborough earthquake was a M_{w} 7.5 earthquake that occurred at 1:40 a.m. on 16 October 1848 with an epicentre in the Marlborough region of the South Island of New Zealand.

In Wellington, the shaking lasted for about two minutes and caused widespread damage, especially to brick or stone structures. Most of the buildings damaged in the earthquake were rebuilt in wood and this contributed to the relatively low level of damage and loss of life in the more powerful Wairarapa earthquake that hit Wellington seven years later.

== Tectonic setting ==
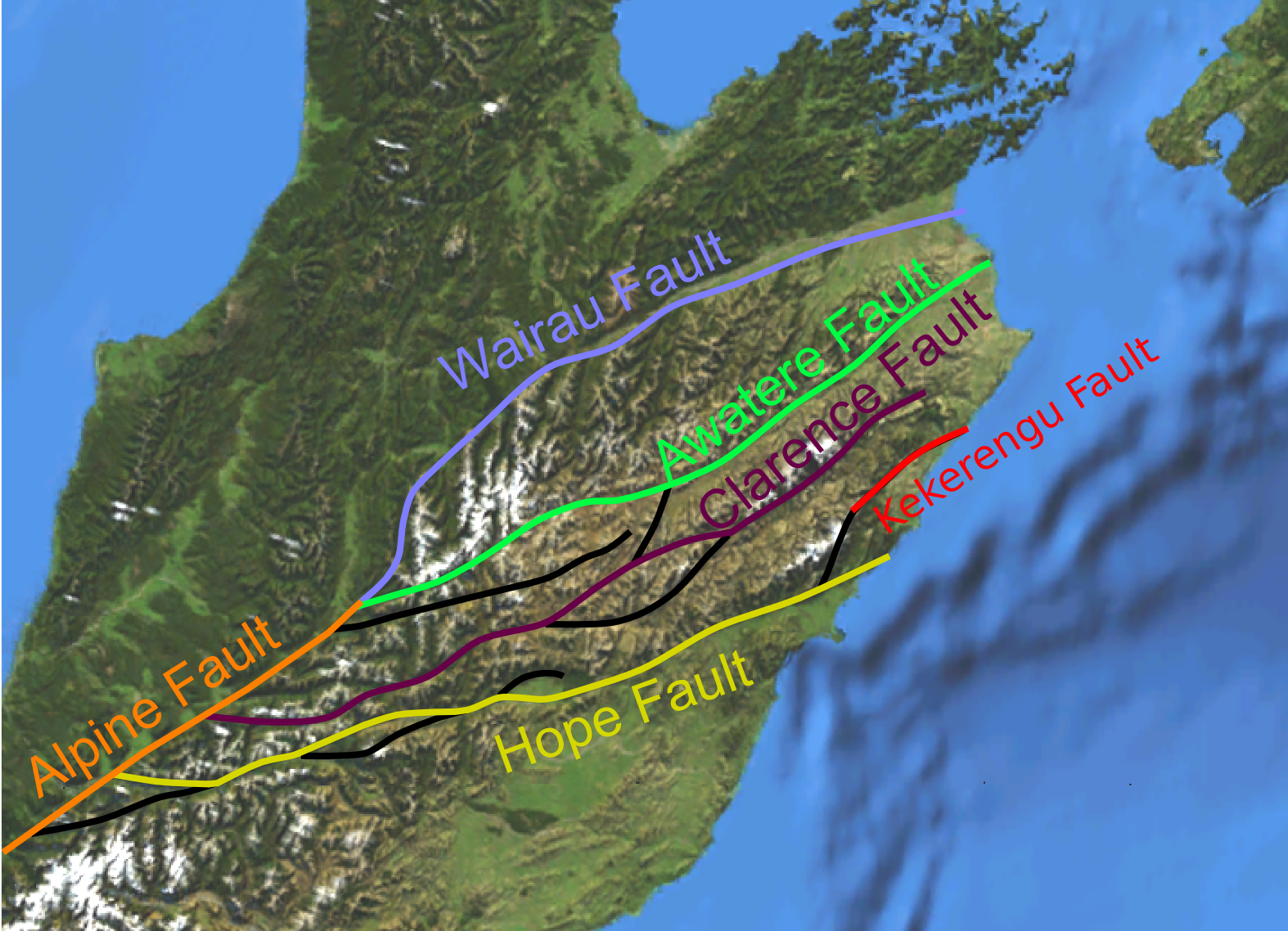
Map of the Marlborough Fault System showing location of the Awatere Fault

New Zealand lies along the boundary between the Australian and Pacific plates. In the South Island most of the relative displacement between these plates is taken up along a single dextral (right lateral) strike-slip fault with a major reverse component, the Alpine Fault. In the North Island, the displacement is mainly taken up along the Kermadec subduction zone, although the remaining dextral strike-slip component of the relative plate motion is accommodated by the North Island Fault System (NIFS). A group of dextral strike-slip structures, known as the Marlborough fault system, transfer displacement between the mainly transform and convergent type plate boundaries in a complex zone at the northern end of South Island.

== Earthquake characteristics ==
The earthquake was associated with the rupturing of a minimum of 105 km of the Awatere Fault, which is part of the Marlborough Fault System. A horizontal displacement of about 6 metres was accompanied by smaller vertical movements of varying sense. A shallow epicentral depth is inferred from the large number of felt aftershocks. A moment magnitude of about 7.5 has been estimated from the rupture length and measured displacements.

== Damage ==
In Wellington, almost all buildings of brick or stone construction were damaged, including homes, churches, the jail, and the Colonial Hospital. Most wooden buildings were undamaged, although many lost their brick chimneys.

Barrack Sergeant James Harris Lovel of the 65th Regiment and two of his young children, Amelia aged 4, and William aged 6, died after being crushed by falling bricks from a wall in Farish Street, Wellington. They are buried at Bolton Street Cemetery.

In the Marlborough region itself, a number of homesteads were badly damaged. Several buildings damaged in the main shock were destroyed during strong aftershocks over the next few days. The only fatalities from the earthquake occurred when a damaged building collapsed during one of the aftershocks the following day.

== See also ==
- List of earthquakes in New Zealand
- List of historical earthquakes
