= Alpine Fault =

Large geological fault in New Zealand

- Movement along the Alpine Fault is deforming the continent of Zealandia, with the southern part (on the Pacific plate) sliding past and slightly onto the northwest part (on the Australian plate).
- Map of active Alpine Fault on land (red). Click on the map to enable mouse over of fault features.
- Etymology: Southern Alps
- Country: New Zealand
- Region: West Coast and Southland regions

Characteristics
- Range: Southern Alps
- Length: 600 km (370 mi)
- Strike: NE-SW
- Displacement: 30 mm (1.2 in)/yr

Tectonics
- Plate: Australian, Pacific
- Status: Active
- Earthquakes: 1717 prehistoric
- Type: Strike-slip fault
- Movement: Up to M_{w} 8.2, dextral/convergent, east side up
- Age: Miocene-Holocene 12–0.0003 Ma
- Orogeny: Kaikoura
- New Zealand geology database (includes faults)

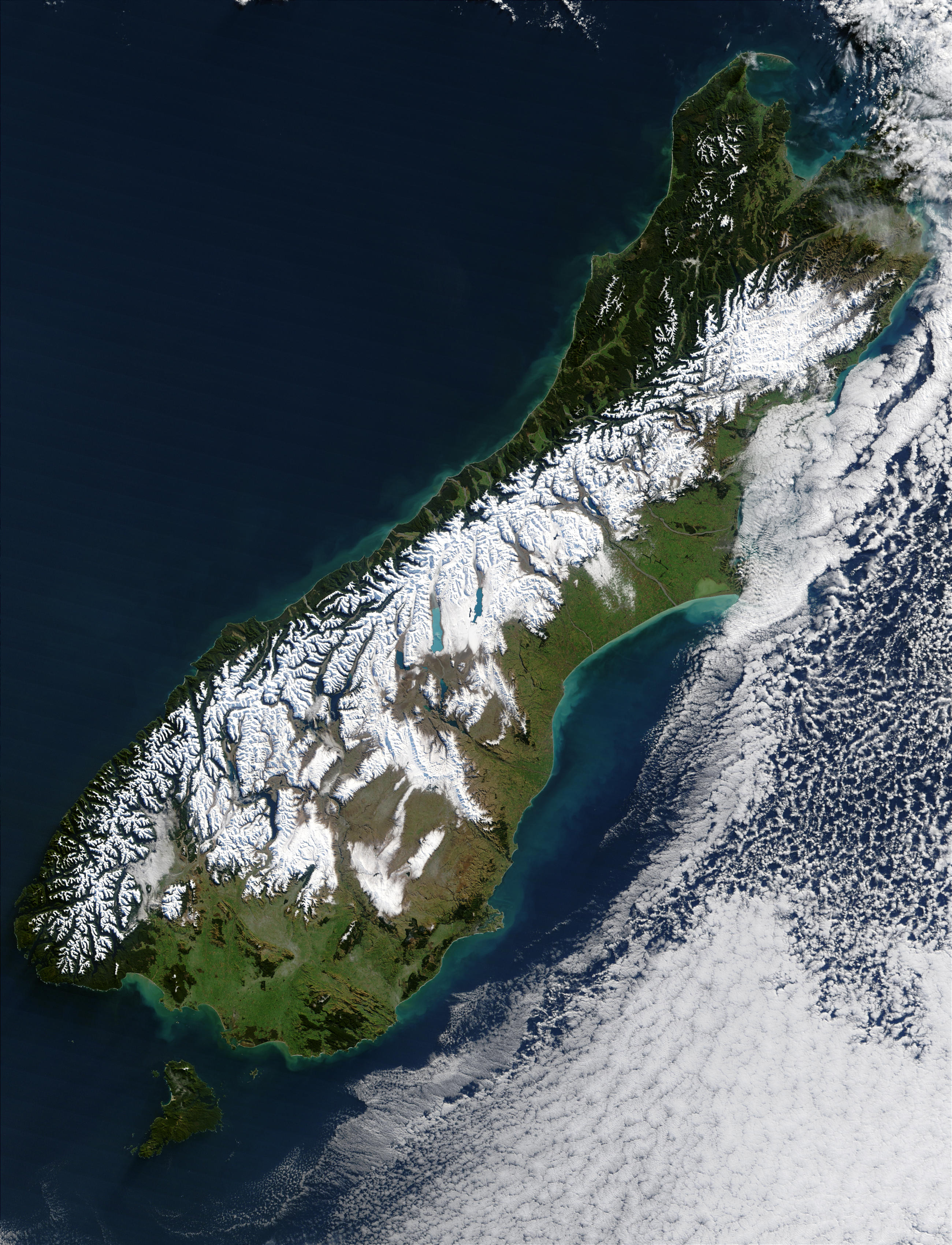
Snow delineates the escarpment formed by the Alpine Fault along the Southern Alps' north-west edge, near the South Island's west coast. This satellite image shows the aftermath of a blizzard that hit the island in July 2003.

The Alpine Fault is a geological fault that runs almost the entire length of New Zealand's South Island, being about 600 km (370 mi) (Note: A former length quoted in the article introduction at 480 km, was noted on article review in May 2023 to be discordant with the length presently quoted in the reference used which is of 600 km. This source, while not an original academic work is an respected source so length was corrected back after further validation as explained in this note. It is quite possible that the reference was updated after the access date of 2018-12-31 or that the 480 km figure is actually the length of off set of the fault, inserted in easy to make error, and indeed the offset constrains the minimum length of the fault. It was further noted that another non academic reference to length of the fault used later in the article claimed a fault length of 850 km. This source, when checked was a press statement on research findings, so not peer-reviewed and is possibly from Nathan 2011 as source. It has been corrected too with context. Berryman's group started using a 800 km figure in their 2012 academic work, which is an increased length from Berryman et al. (1992). This gave a 650 km length including the Wairau Fault which many workers do not include in the fault length. There is no evidence yet of full rupture including the Wairau Fault (see article). There is evidence for off shore full length fault rupture however as in the 1717 event. The 800 km length includes the Wairau Fault and assumes the off shore portion ends just south of Fiordland. The length of the fault will depend upon how much if any of the southern off shore portion is included or if the Wairau Fault is added. The GNS New Zealand Active Fault database maps about 520 km of fault on land or if the fault was a straight line end to end about 500 km. The total length of the South Island is about 800 km for reference. Academic work on the fault does not always state its total length.) long, and forms the boundary between the Pacific plate and the Australian plate. The Southern Alps have been uplifted on the fault over the last 12 million years in a series of earthquakes. However, most of the motion on the fault is strike-slip (side to side), with the Tasman district and West Coast moving north and Canterbury and Otago moving south. The average slip rates in the fault's central region are about 38 mm (1.5 in) a year, very fast by global standards. The last major seismic event on the fault was a great (magnitude of 8 or more) earthquake of M_{w} 8.1± 0.1 in about 1717 AD. The probability of another one occurring before 2068 was estimated at 75 percent in 2021.

== Geographic extent and plate motion ==
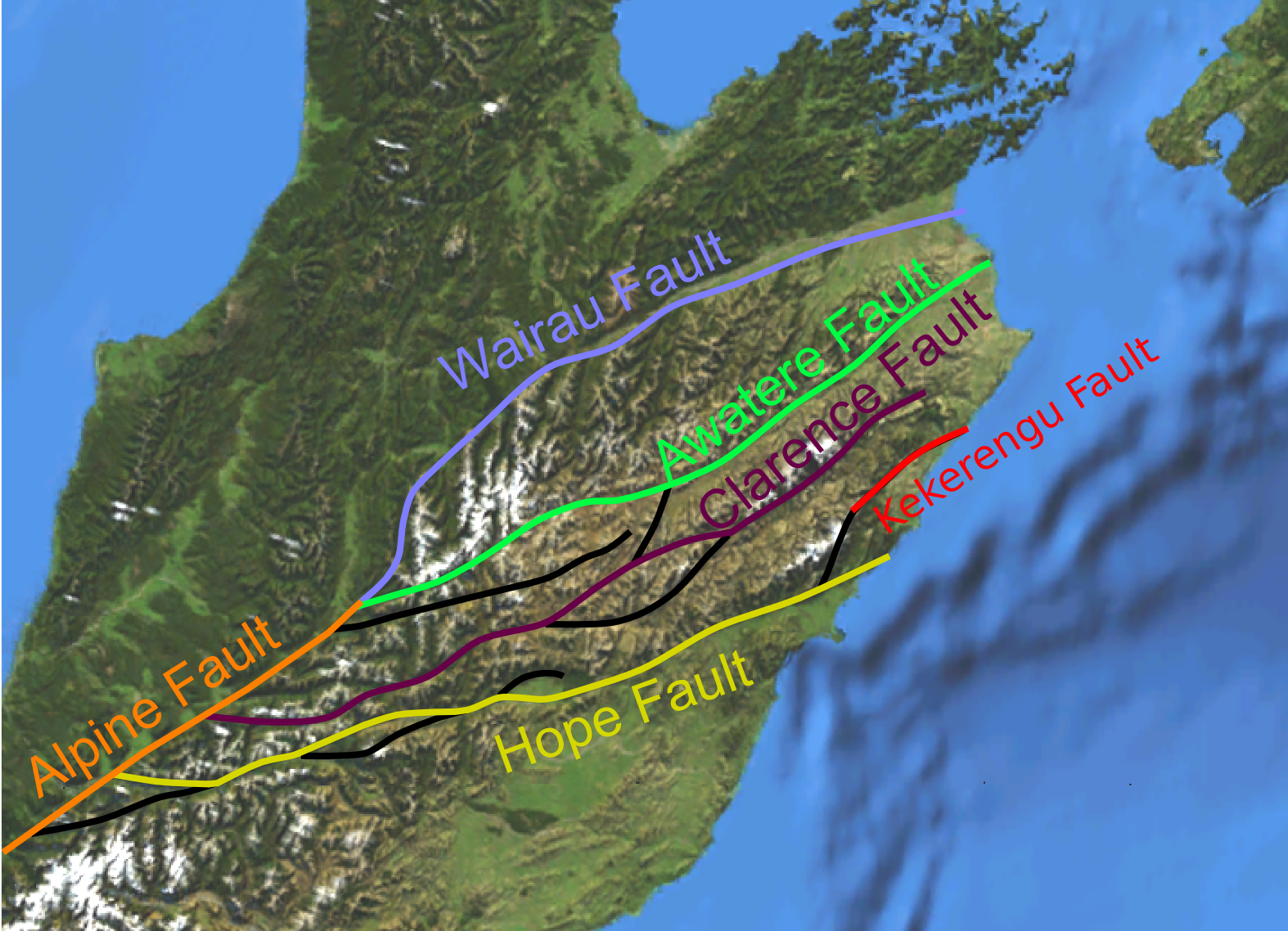
Map of the northern end of the Alpine Fault and Marlborough Fault System.

The Pacific plate and Indo-Australian plate boundary forms the Macquarie Fault Zone in the Puysegur Trench off the southwestern corner of the South Island and comes onshore as the Alpine Fault just north of Milford Sound. The Alpine Fault then runs the length of the South Island just west of the Southern Alps to near Lewis Pass in the central northern section of the island. At this point, it splits into a set of smaller faults known as the Marlborough fault system. This set of faults, which includes the Wairau Fault, the Hope Fault, the Awatere Fault, and the Clarence Fault, transfer displacement between the Alpine Fault and the Hikurangi subduction zone to the north. The Hope Fault is thought to represent the primary continuation of the Alpine Fault.

== Tectonics ==
The Australian plate, which is in the process of again separating from the Indo-Australian plate, is subducting towards the east south of the South Island and the Pacific plate is subducting towards the west to the north. In the middle, the Alpine Fault is a transform boundary and has both dextral (right-lateral) strike-slip movement and uplift on the southeastern side. The uplift is due to an element of convergence between the plates, meaning that the fault has a significant high-angle reverse oblique component to its displacement.

In the northern section of the fault the transition to the Marlborough Fault System reflects transfer displacement between the mainly transform plate boundary of the Alpine fault and the mainly destructive boundary further northwards from the Hikurangi Subduction Zone to the Kermadec Trench. This has resulted in a complex splaying of faults, which is associated with large earthquakes adjacent to, but off the Alpine fault itself, such the 1929 Murchison earthquake, 1968 Inangahua earthquake and 1929 Arthur's Pass earthquake. (Note: Tectonically the faults responsive for the 1929 earthquakes and the 1968 earthquake in Westland and Canterbury are parallel to the Alpine fault and offset from it by about 50 km (31 mi).)

The Alpine Fault has the greatest uplift of the Pacific plate near Aoraki / Mount Cook in its central section. Here the relative motion between the two plates averages 37–40 mm a year. This is distributed as 36–39 mm of horizontal and 6–10 mm upwards movement on the fault's plane per year.

At the southern end of the fault there is effectively no uplift component of the Pacific plate and other faults share the strain as a result of the plate collision. These include in Fiordland faults associated with the 2003 Fiordland earthquake and 2009 Dusky Sound earthquake, the Otago fault system, in Canterbury faults such as the Ostler Fault Zone and those associated with the 7.1 M_{W} Darfield earthquake. The uplift in this South Westland region of the fault which has a dextral strike-slip rate of about 28 mm (1.1 in)/year is on the Australian plate side of it with meter scale vertical uplift every 290 years odd.

== Geological origin and evolution ==
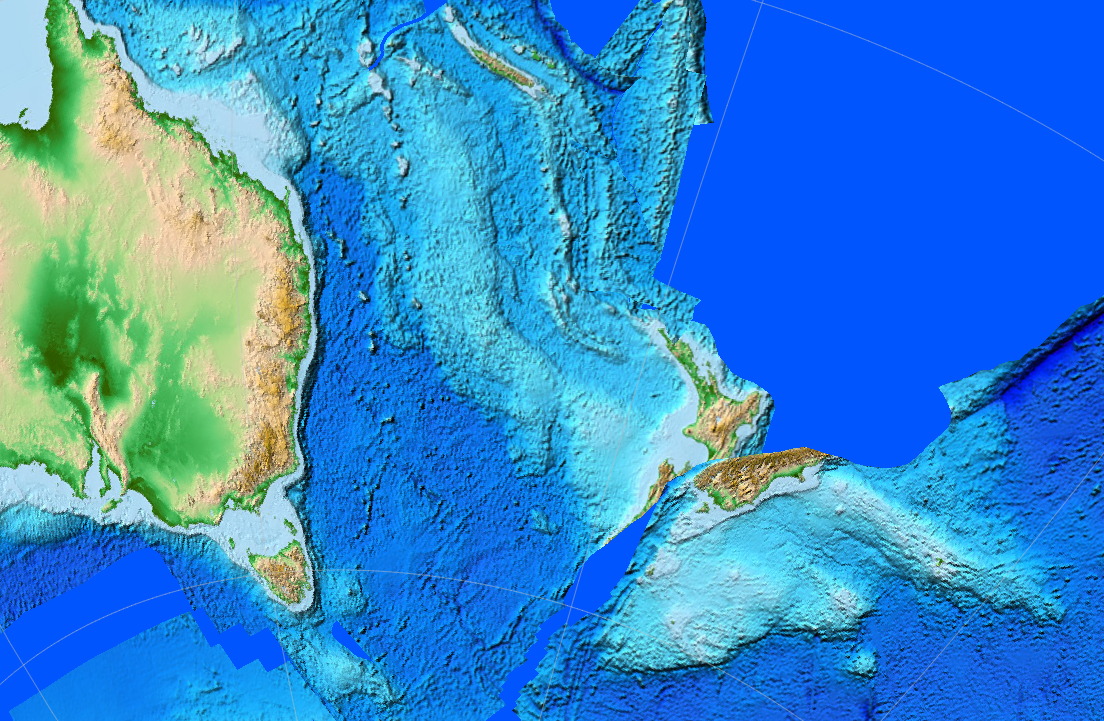
New Zealand before the activation of the Alpine Fault (30 Ma).

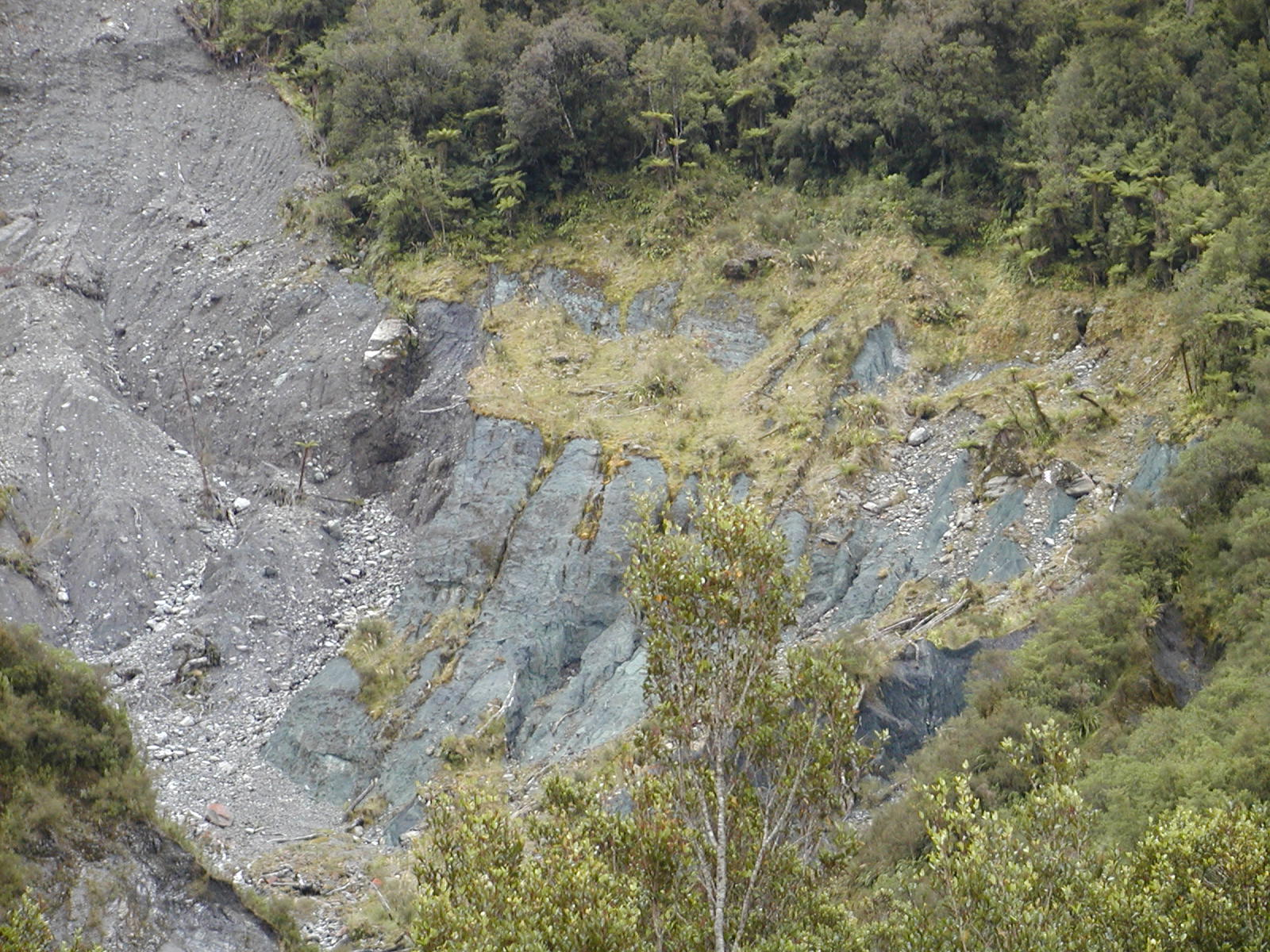
Outcrop showing hydrothermally altered cataclasite in green, within the Alpine Fault zone, Waikukupa River.

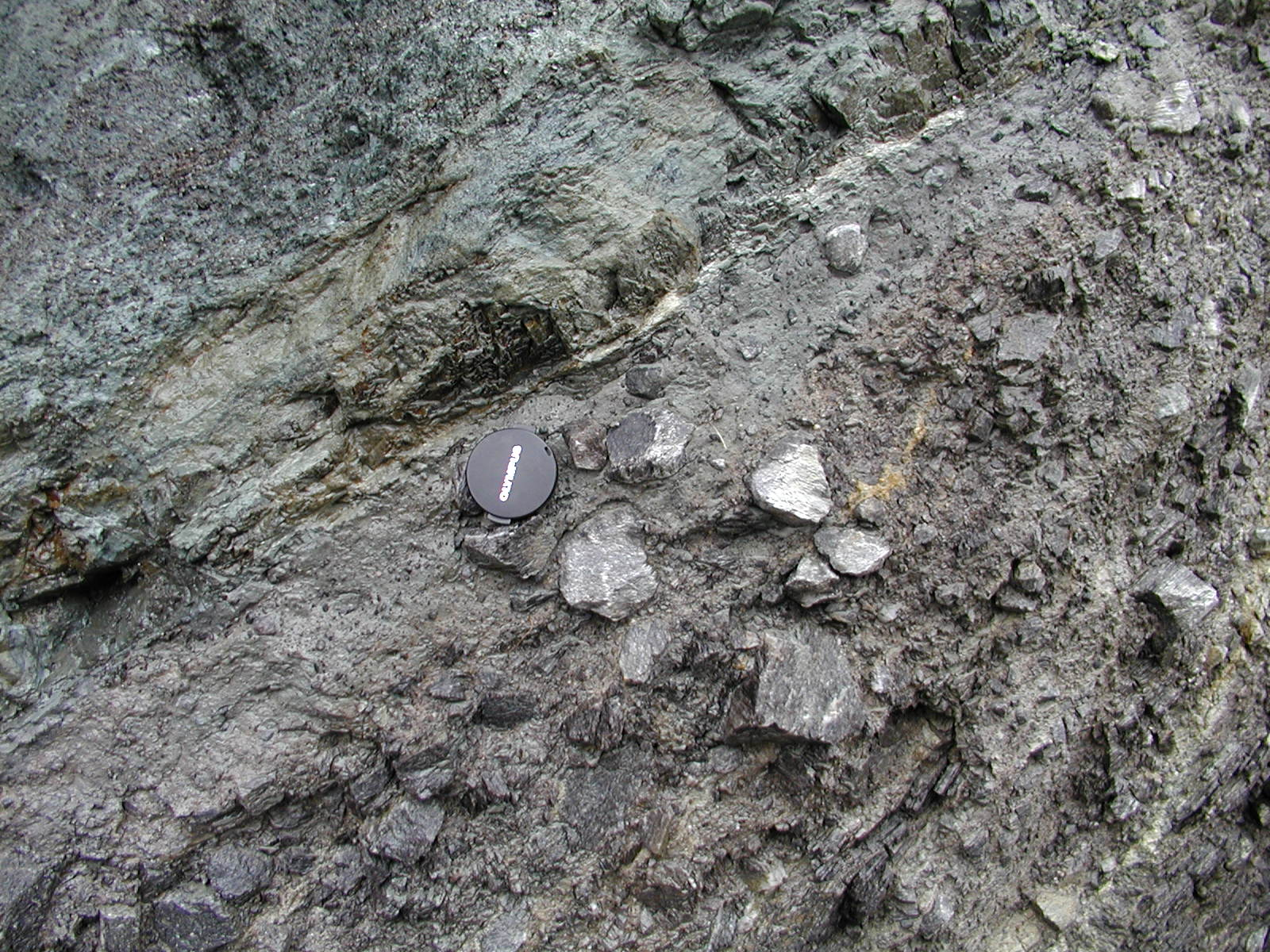
Alpine Fault outcrop showing banded cataclasite and breccia, Waikukupa River.

Between 25 and 12 million years ago the movement on the proto-Alpine Fault was exclusively strike-slip. The Southern Alps had not yet formed and most of New Zealand was covered in water. Then uplift slowly began as the plate motion became slightly oblique to the strike of the Alpine Fault. In the last 12 million years, the Southern Alps have been uplifted approximately 20 km (12 mi), however, as this has occurred more rain has been trapped by the mountains leading to more erosion. This, along with isostatic constraints, has kept the Southern Alps less than 4,000 m (13,000 ft) high.

Uplift on the Alpine Fault has led to the exposure of deep metamorphic rocks near the fault within the Southern Alps. This includes mylonites and the Alpine Schist, which increases in metamorphic grade towards the fault. The eroded material has formed the Canterbury Plains. The Alpine Fault is not a single structure but often splits into pure strike-slip and dip-slip components. Near the surface, the fault can have multiple rupture zones.

== Fault zone geology ==
The fault zone is exposed at numerous locations along the West Coast, and typically consists of a 10 to 50 m wide fault gouge zone with pervasive hydrothermal alteration. This last is because water penetrates down to up to 6 km (3.7 mi) through hot rock associated with the fault. The water then can arise in hot springs with temperatures of over 50 °C (122 °F) in the fault valley, although the temperature of the water at depth is much more extreme. Most of the movement along the fault occurs in this zone. In outcrop, the fault zone is overlain by mylonites which formed at depth and have been uplifted by the fault.

A structural study of a segment of the Alpine Fault to the southwest of Fiordland examined the Dagg Basin, an offshore sedimentary basin at 3,000 m (9,800 ft) depth. Basin sediments are primarily from Pleistocene glaciation, and structures within them reveal a past complexity that is no longer present in the basin. The current structure is a pull-apart basin along a releasing bend in the Alpine Fault, with a segment of inverted basin along the southern edge due to transpression. The study discussed the short-lived nature of the releasing bend (on the order of 10^{5} to 10^{6} years), during which there were 450 – 1650 m of dextral displacement. The nature of the displacement served as an example of the kinds of ephemeral structures that can develop along a mature strike-slip fault system.

== Earthquakes ==
There have been no major historical earthquakes on the Alpine Fault. Because of this, during the mid-20th century it was speculated that the Alpine Fault creeps without making large earthquakes. However, it is now inferred by multiples lines of evidence that the Alpine Fault ruptures, creating major earthquakes approximately every few hundred years. The last whole fault rupture event was in 1717 and is now known to have been a great (M_{w} ≥8) earthquake of M_{w} 8.1± 0.1. There is also fair evidence for a post 1717 event confined to North Westland section of the fault but the date is unclear. There are two modes of large earthquake behaviour with either major (M_{W} 7–8) or great earthquakes and predicting the next mode is a challenge as these appear to evolve over multiple seismic cycles in response to along-strike differences in geometry.

=== Prehistoric ===
Māori arrived in New Zealand about 1300 but never reached a high population density in the colder South Island. Therefore, while earthquakes are an important part of Māori oral tradition, no stories have been passed down about South Island earthquakes. Over the last thousand years, the major ruptures along the Alpine Fault, causing earthquakes of about magnitude 8 had previously been determined to have occurred at least four times. These had separation of between 100 and 350 years. The 1717 quake appeared to have involved a rupture along nearly 400 kilometres (250 mi) of the southern two-thirds of the fault. Scientists say that a similar earthquake could happen at any time, as the interval since 1717 is longer than the intervals between the earlier events. Newer research carried out by the University of Otago, the Australian Nuclear Science and Technology Organisation and others has revised the dates and nature of the earthquakes and given greater understanding of their number. Studies at Haast towards the centre of the fault only identified three major rupture events in the last 1000 years. Studies at the far southern end identified seven events in the last 2000 years and the most southern 20 km (12 mi) of the fault has had 27 events since 6000 BCE. This information has been updated with better dating techniques and is summarised in the following timeline for the various sections of the fault.

This work suggests that large fault ruptures occurred in 1717, about 1400, about 1100 and about 390 CE.

=== Prediction of next earthquake ===
In 2012, GNS Science researchers published an 8000-year timeline of 24 major earthquakes on the (southern end of the) fault from sediments at Hokuri Creek, near Lake McKerrow in north Fiordland. In earthquake terms, the up to 800 kilometres (500 mi) long fault was remarkably consistent, rupturing on average every 330 years, at intervals ranging from 140 years to 510 years. In 2017, GNS researchers revised the figures after they combined updated Hokuri site records with a thousand-year record from another site, 20 km away at John O'Groats River, to produce a record of 27 major earthquake events during the 8000-year period. This gave a mean recurrence rate of 291 years, plus or minus 23 years, versus the previously estimated rate of 329 years, plus or minus 26 years. In the new study, the interval between earthquakes ranged from 160 to 350 years, and the probability of an earthquake occurring in the 50 years following 2017 was estimated at 29 percent for this southern sector of the fault alone. A 2021 study estimated the probability of an earthquake occurring before 2068 was 75 percent.

=== Projected effects of a rupture ===
Large ruptures can also trigger earthquakes on the faults continuing north from the Alpine Fault. There is paleotsunami evidence of near-simultaneous ruptures of the Alpine Fault and Wellington (and/or other major) faults to the north having occurred at least twice in the past 1,000 years. A 2018 study says that a significant rupture in the Alpine Fault could lead to roads (particularly in or to the West Coast) being blocked for months, as with the 2016 Kaikōura earthquake, with problems in supplying towns and evacuating tourists. District councils along the West Coast and in Canterbury have commissioned studies and begun preparations for an anticipated large earthquake on the Alpine Fault.

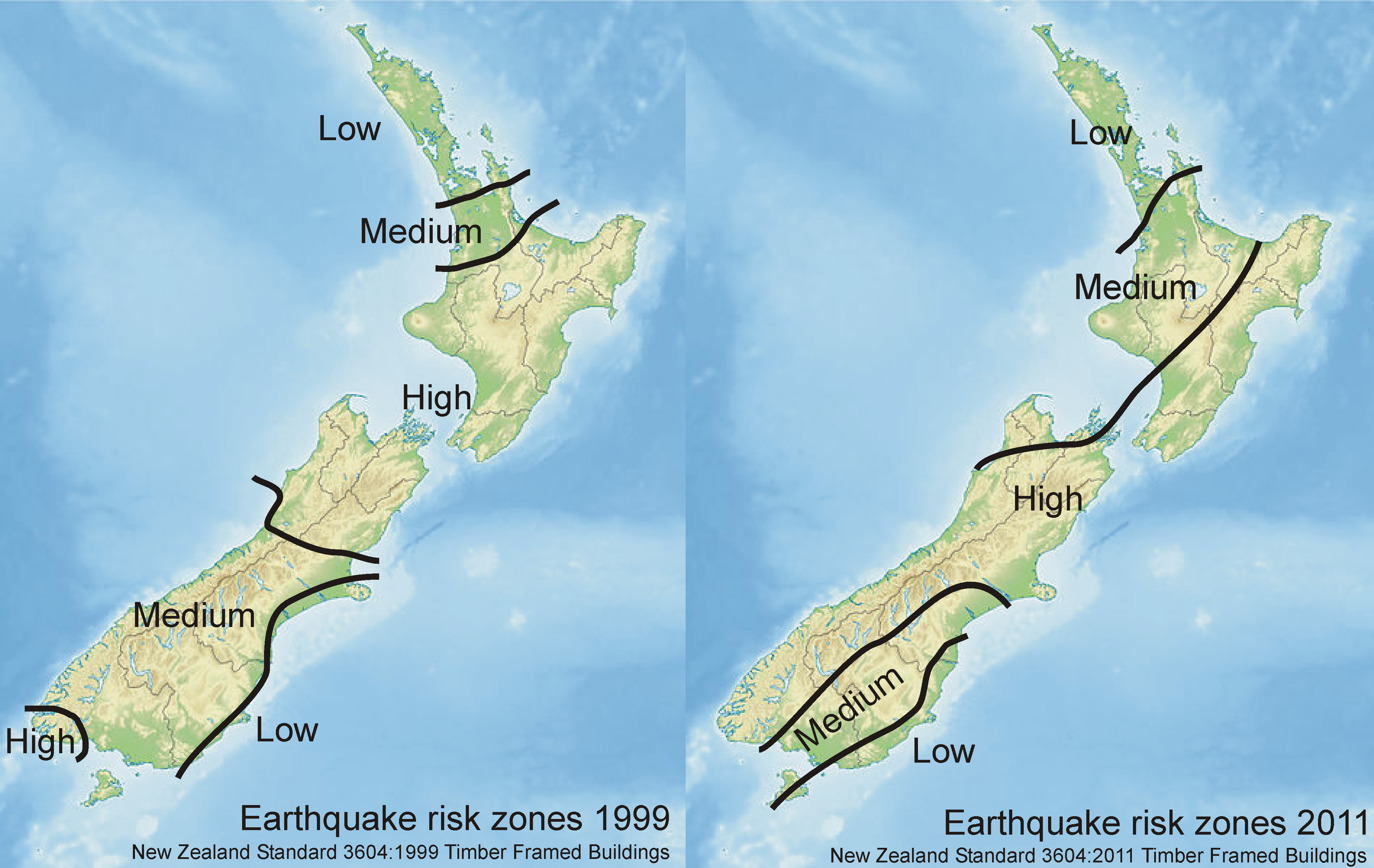
Earthquake risk zones New Zealand. Until 2011, the lack of historical earthquakes on the Alpine Fault was interpreted as meaning lower risk.

== History of research ==
In 1940, Harold Wellman found that the Southern Alps were associated with a fault line approximately 650 km (400 miles) long. The fault was officially named the Alpine Fault in 1942 as an extension of a previously mapped structure. At the same time, Harold Wellman proposed the 480 kilometres (300 mi) lateral displacement on the Alpine Fault. This displacement was inferred by Wellman due in part to the similarity of rocks in Southland and Nelson on either side of the Alpine Fault. Lateral displacements of this magnitude could not be explained by pre-plate tectonics geology and his ideas were not initially widely accepted until 1956. Wellman also proposed in 1964 that the Alpine Fault was a Cenozoic structure, which was in conflict with the older Mesozoic age accepted at the time. This idea coupled with the displacement on the fault proposed that the earth's surface was in relatively rapid constant movement and helped to overthrow the old geosynclinal hypothesis in favour of plate tectonics.

In 1964 a 25-metre-long concrete wall was built across the fault to measure the fault's movements and to find if it moves slowly over time or suddenly during big earthquakes. The wall has not moved since being built, which indicates that the build up of energy is released suddenly during large earthquakes.

Richard Norris and Alan Cooper from the Department of Geology, University of Otago conducted extensive research on the structure and petrology of the Alpine Fault respectively throughout the later 20th and early 21st centuries. It was during this time that the cyclicity of the Alpine Fault earthquakes and meaning of the increase in metamorphic grade towards the fault was discovered and refined. Originally this regional increase in grade was inferred to be from frictional heating along the fault not uplift of deeper geological sequences. Richard H. Sibson from the same university also used the Alpine Fault to refine his nomenclature of fault rocks which gained international adherence.

Chorus's dark fibre cables that pass through the Alpine Fault, from the north and south of Haast, are used for distributed acoustic sensing, which detects cable movement produced by earthquakes. Measurements are made using 7,250 'interrogator' locations, spaced four metres apart, which emit and detect pulses of light, generating about a gigabyte of data per minute.

=== Deep Fault Drilling Project ===
The Deep Fault Drilling Project (DFDP) was an attempt in 2014 to retrieve rock and fluid samples and make geophysical measurements inside the Alpine Fault zone at depth. It was a $2.5 million international research project designed to drill 1.3 km to the fault plan in two months. The DFDP was the second project to try to drill an active fault zone and return samples after the San Andreas Fault Observatory at Depth. One of the goals of the project was to use the deformed rocks from the fault zone to determine its resistance to stress. Researchers also planned to install long term equipment for measuring pressure, temperature and seismic activity near the fault zone. It was led by New Zealand geologists Rupert Sutherland, John Townsend and Virginia Toy and involves an international team from New Zealand, Canada, France, Germany, Japan, the United Kingdom, and the United States.

In 2017, they reported they had discovered beneath Whataroa, a small township on the Alpine Fault, "extreme" hydrothermal activity which "could be commercially very significant". One of the lead researchers said that it is likely to be globally unique.

== See also ==
- Geology of New Zealand
- List of earthquakes in New Zealand
- San Andreas Fault
