= Japan Trench Fast Drilling Project =

Scientific expedition on 2011 earthquake

The Japan Trench Fast Drilling Project (JFAST) was a rapid-response scientific expedition that drilled oceanfloor boreholes through the fault-zone of the 2011 Tohoku earthquake. JFAST gathered important data about the rupture mechanism and physical properties of the fault that caused the huge earthquake and tsunami which devastated much of northeast Japan.

== Background ==
The 2011 Tohoku-oki earthquake, with a moment magnitude of 9.0, was the largest in Japan's history, and severely damaged regions of northeast Honshu, with over 15,000 deaths and economic losses of $US 200 to 300 billion. Because of the huge societal impact, there was an urgency among scientists to respond with information and research results to explain the disastrous event. Soon after the earthquake, researchers of the Integrated Ocean Drilling Program (IODP) began planning the Japan Trench Fast Drilling Project (JFAST) to investigate the earthquake with ocean floor boreholes to the plate boundary fault.

This ambitious project drilled boreholes through the fault that slipped during the earthquake in order to understand the unprecedented huge slip (40 to 60 meters) that occurred on the shallow portion of the megathrust fault and was the primary source of the large tsunami that devastated much of the coast of northeast Honshu. There was much public interest in this high-profile scientific project with considerable Japanese and English media coverage of the operations and results

Specific science objectives included,

- Estimation of the stress (mechanics) state in the region of the shallow fault from borehole breakouts.
- Retrieval of core sample from the plate boundary fault zone to see geologic structures and measure physical properties of the fault zone. Before this project, no one had directly seen a fault zone that recently moved tens of meters in an earthquake.
- Measurement of the temperature across the fault zone to estimate the level of dynamic friction during the earthquake. These thermal observations needed to be done quickly after the earthquake and was the main reason for the rapid mobilization of JFAST.

The site for the offshore drilling was located about 220 km east of Sendai in the region of very large fault slip during the earthquake near the Japan Trench.

== Deep water drilling operations ==
The D/V Chikyu, operated by the Japan Agency for Marine-Earth Science and Technology (JAMSTEC) sailed on IODP Expedition 343 from the port of Shimizu, Shizuoka on April 1, 2012, within 13 months after the earthquake. Chikyu is the only research vessel with the capabilities for the necessary drilling in very deep water of over 6900 meters. Two months of operations from April 1 to 24 May 24, 2012 were scheduled for drilling several boreholes to carry out Logging while drilling (LWD), install temperature sensors and retrieve core samples. The extreme water depths caused many technical challenges that had to be considered, such as the strength of the long pipe string, onboard handling of the pipe sections, and instrument operations at very high water pressure. These aspects needed careful planning and new tools on the ship. Various equipment had not been previously used in such deep water and caused many problems and delays during the first month at sea. Eventually difficult engineering problems were overcome enabling retrieval of borehole core and installation of a temperature observatory across the fault zone at a depth of about 820 meters below the sea floor. New records were set for scientific drilling including, longest drilling string (7740 m) from the ocean surface and deepest core from the ocean surface (7752 m).

Because of delays due to technical difficulties and bad weather, the temperature observatory could not be deployed during the main expedition. However, during the supplementary Expedition 343T from July 5 to 19 a new borehole was quickly drilled and the temperature sensors were installed

Retrieval of the temperature data was scheduled for cruise KR13-04 during February 11 to 20, 2013 using the JAMSTEC ship R/V Kairei and Remotely Operated Vehicle (ROV) Kaiko-7000II. Kaiko-7000II is one of the few vehicles that can operate at 7000 meters water depth. Because of inclement weather and navigation problems the instruments could not be retrieved at this time. However, during the subsequent cruise KR13-08 from April 21 to May 9, 2013, the temperature instruments were successfully recovered on April 26.

== Scientific results ==
=== Borehole stress ===
Fractures in the borehole wall (borehole breakouts) were used to estimate the stress field in the region close to the fault zone. These fractures can be observed in the wall resistivity records obtained from the LWD data. From the orientations and crack widths of the fractures, the direction and magnitude of the stress can be calculated. The results of these analyses show that the region has changed from a thrust fault regime before the earthquake to a normal fault regime after the earthquake. The horizontal stress became close to zero, indicating that almost all of the stress was released during the earthquake. This confirms previous suggestions that the earthquake had a complete stress drop, which is different from most other large earthquakes.

=== Fault zone ===
From the core samples, geologic structure data and measurements of physical properties, a single plate-boundary fault zone was identified with a high level of confidence at a depth of about 820 meters below the seafloor. The fault is localized in a thin layer of highly deformed pelagic clays. The entire section of the fault zone was not retrieved, but from the amount of the recovered and unrecovered sections, the total width of the fault zone is determined to be less than 5 meters. This is a considerably simpler and thinner plate-boundary fault than has been observed at other locations, such as the Nankai Trough . The actual slip surface for the 2011 earthquake may not have been recovered, but it is assumed that the structures and physical properties of the core are representative of the entire fault zone.

=== Fault friction ===
One of the main objectives of JFAST was to estimate the level of friction on the fault during the earthquake. To determine the frictional strength, high-speed laboratory experiments were carried out on samples from the plate boundary fault zone. The measured shear stress strength for permeable and impermeable conditions yielded values of 1.32 and 0.22 MPa, respectively, with the equivalent values for the coefficient of friction of 0.19 and 0.03, respectively. These results show that the fault slipped with very low levels of friction, which are lower than observed from other subduction zones, such as the Nankai Trough. The very low frictional strength for the material from the Japan Trench fault zone is much lower than typically observed for other types of rocks. The low friction properties are largely caused by the high content of the clay mineral smectite. Examination of the microstructures in the laboratory samples, suggests that fluids are important in the faulting process and contribute to the low friction properties, possibly through thermal pressurization.

The temperature measurements were also designed to estimate the frictional heat on the fault by measuring the thermal anomaly at the fault zone. A temperature signal was clearly observed in the data about 4 months after instrument installation which is 18 month after the earthquake. At that time the temperature in the fault zone was about 0.3 °C above the geothermal gradient. This is interpreted to represent the frictional heat produced at the time of the earthquake. Analyses of these data showed that the coefficient of friction on the fault at the time of the earthquake was about 0.08 and the average shear stress on the fault was estimated to be 0.54 MPa. The temperature measurements give independent and similar results to the laboratory friction experiments, and confirm the very low frictional properties of the fault. The low friction properties likely contributed to the very large slip during the earthquake.

== Summary ==
JFAST is considered to be a successful rapid scientific response to a natural hazard event that had a great societal impact. Technical challenges associated with drilling in very deep water of about 6900 meters were overcome enabling borehole stress measurements, recovery of valuable core samples of the plate-boundary fault zone and collection of unique temperature measurements. The results of the scientific investigations show that the huge slip during the 2011 Tohoku earthquake occurred on a simple and thin fault zone composed of pelagic sediments with a high smectite content. Both laboratory experiments on the fault zone material and temperature measurements across the fault zone, show that the friction level was very low during the earthquake. The localized fault zone, low friction properties of its material and complete stress drop during the earthquake, are important characteristics that likely contributed to the huge slip during the earthquake.

== See also ==
- Drilling Vessel Chikyū
- Integrated Ocean Drilling Program
