= Alexander McKay (geologist) =

New Zealand geologist and photographer (1841–1917)

Alexander McKay (11 April 1841 – 8 July 1917) was a New Zealand geologist.

== Career ==
Born in Carsphairn, McKay reached New Zealand in 1863 where he spent a number of years prospecting for gold. A meeting with Julius von Haast saw a change of direction in which McKay, largely self-taught, undertook geological mapping and fossil collecting expeditions throughout the islands.

McKay harboured dreams of becoming a commercial photographer. In 1867, he was based on an isolated farm in South Canterbury and in 1868 spent several weeks in Christchurch undertaking training with Edward Wheeler & Co. on wet-plate photography.

In 1872, James Hector appointed him to the Geological Survey of New Zealand. During his geological work McKay took numerous photographs. He invented a telephoto lens and also techniques for taking images of geological collections and fossils.

McKay's greatest achievement was to free New Zealand sciences from the strictures of European-based thinking, developing new theories, of worldwide importance, on block faulting in the evolution of mountain systems. The discipline of neotectonics is largely based upon McKay's observations and theories.
