= Richard B. Sibson =

New Zealand ornithologist

Richard Broadley Sibson (27 May 1911 – 13 July 1994) was a notable New Zealand teacher and ornithologist. He was born in Cliffe, Kent, England in 1911.
