= Kaikōura orogeny =

Seismic formation event

The Kaikōura Orogeny is a New Zealand orogeny that has given birth to the Southern Alps. It began 25 million years ago along the Alpine Fault.

In this orogeny, the Southern Alps are being formed because the Pacific Plate is colliding with the Australian Plate, with a predominant oblique dextral motion, but a minor component of thrust faulting. As the plates collide, the crust thickens, with deformation and associated uplift due to isostacy occurring primarily within the Pacific Plate.

== Uplift ==
From 25 to 15 million years ago most of New Zealand was still covered by ocean. Almost all the land that broke the surface of the sea was Torlesse Greywacke. Then the plates started to collide, the crust of New Zealand came under pressure and the Alpine Fault was formed.

Then from 15 million to 5 million years ago the Pacific Plate was rammed up over the Australian Plate along the newly created Alpine Fault. The pressure applied from 25 to 15 million years ago had simply been too much and the crust thickened. This gave birth to the first of the Southern Alps. Also during this period of time, chlorite-grade schist was brought to the surface.

From 5 million years ago to the present day the rate of uplift has accelerated. Oligoclase and biotite schist have also been pushed to the surface of the Earth.

In total about 20 kilometres of uplift has taken place during the Kaikoura Orogeny but most of this has been eroded.
