= Hope River (Canterbury) =

Coordinates: 42°35′36.72″S 172°32′55.92″E

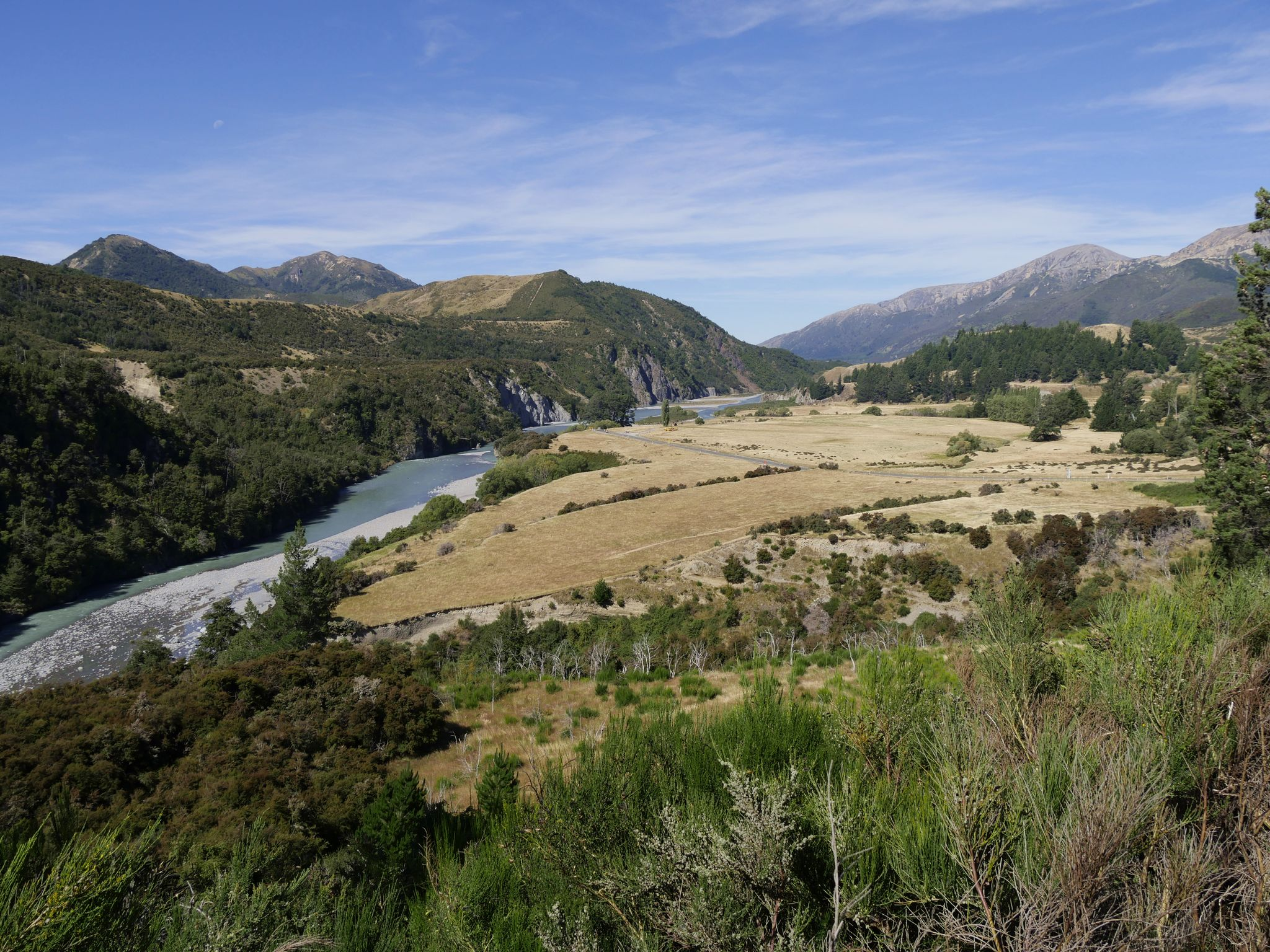
- Hope River valley

- Location of the mouth within New Zealand

Location
- Country: New Zealand

Physical characteristics
- Mouth
  - location: Waiau Uwha River

The Hope River, in Canterbury, New Zealand, is a tributary of the Waiau Uwha River. It is one of three rivers by that name in the South Island.

The Hope River rises at the Hope Pass in the Southern Alps, which is the main divide for the South Island. The river runs northeast through Lake Sumner Forest Park then south until it turns east along a large valley formed by the Hope Fault, a significant tectonic fault line.

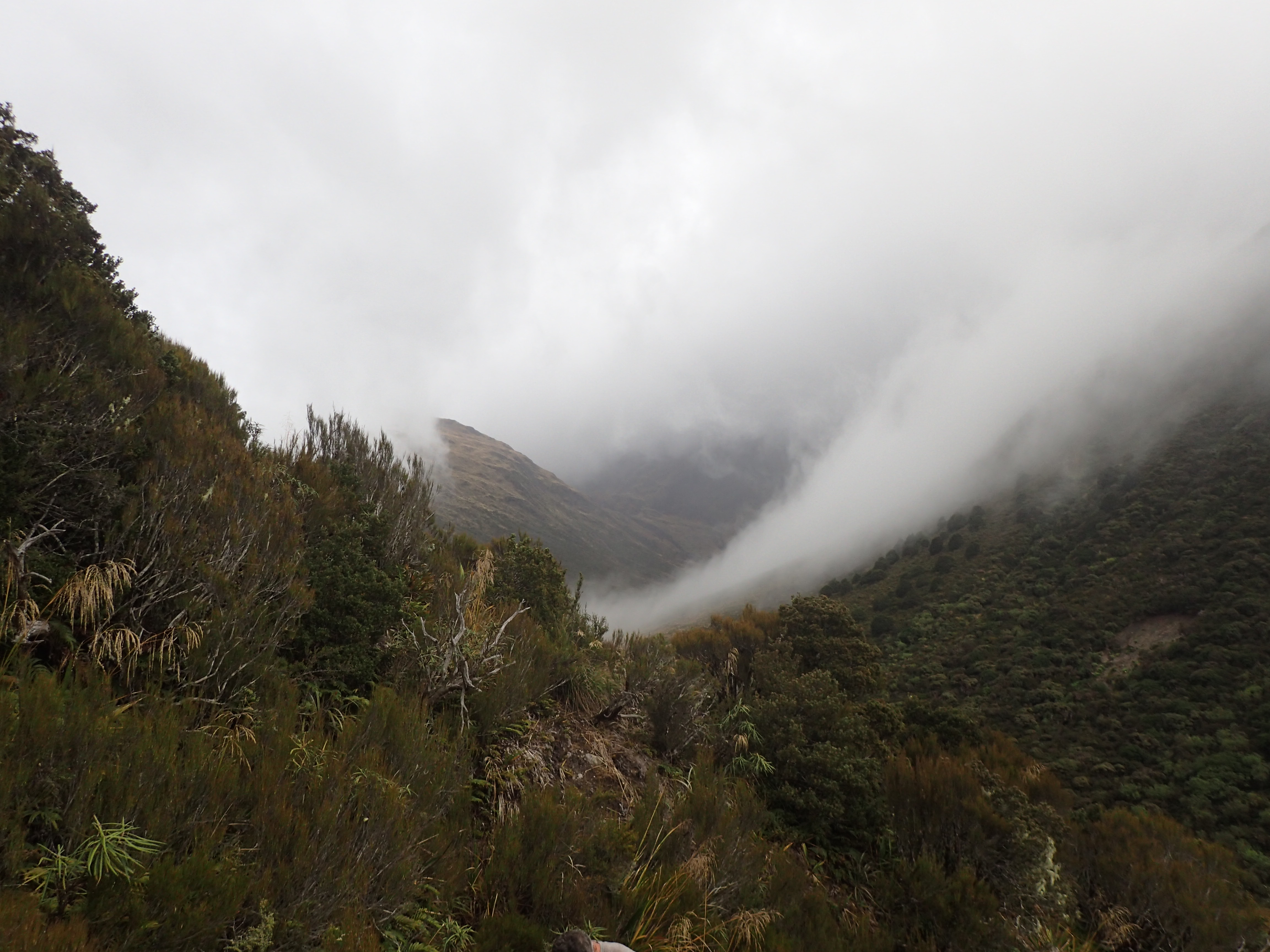
Hope Pass is the Headwater of the Hope River Canterbury New Zealand

It is joined by a major tributary, the Boyle River which flows south from the Lewis Pass some 12 kilometres (7.5 mi) above its confluence with the Waiau Uwha. The Waiau Uwha enters from a side valley and continues eastward along the Hope Fault's valley before turning south through a gorge near Hanmer Springs.

A walking track follows the river and there are several huts managed by the Department of Conservation.

== See also ==
- List of rivers of New Zealand
