= Active fault =

Geological fault likely to be the source of an earthquake sometime in the future

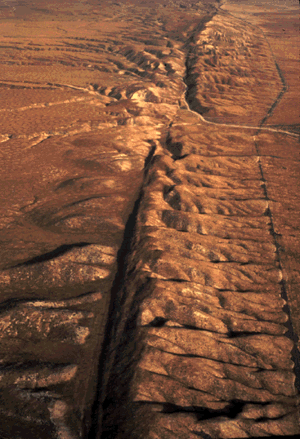
San Andreas Fault

An active fault is a fault that is likely to become the source of another earthquake sometime in the future. Geologists commonly consider faults to be active if there has been movement observed or evidence of seismic activity during the last 10,000 years.

Active faulting is considered to be a geologic hazard – one related to earthquakes as a cause. Effects of movement on an active fault include strong ground motion, surface faulting, tectonic deformation, landslides and rockfalls, liquefaction, tsunamis, and seiches.

Quaternary faults are those active faults that have been recognized at the surface and which have evidence of movement during the Quaternary Period.

Related geological disciplines for active-fault studies include geomorphology, seismology, reflection seismology, plate tectonics, geodetics and remote sensing, risk analysis, and others.

== Location ==
Active faults tend to occur in the vicinity of tectonic plate boundaries, and active fault research has focused on these regions. Active faults tend to occur less within the area of any given plate. The fact that intraplate regions may also present seismic hazards has only recently been recognized.

== Measurement ==
Various geologic methods are used to define the boundaries of an active fault such as remote sensing and magnetic measurements, as well as other ways. Several types of data, such as seismologic reports or records over time, are used to gauge fault activity. Activity and fault area are correlated, and risk analysis is employed with other factors to determine the potential earthquake hazard.

== Geologic conditions in U.S. ==
The geologic conditions and tectonic setting in much of the Western U.S. has resulted in the region being underlain by relatively thin crust and having high heat flow, both of which can favor relatively high deformation rates and active faulting.

In contrast, in the Central and Eastern U.S. (CEUS) the crust is thicker, colder, older, and more stable. Furthermore, the CEUS is thousands of miles from active plate boundaries, so the rates of deformation are low in this region. Nevertheless, the CEUS has had some rather large earthquakes in historical times, including a series of major earthquakes near New Madrid, Missouri in 1811–1812, a large earthquake near Charleston, South Carolina in 1886, and the Cape Ann earthquake northeast of Boston in 1755.
