= Geology of the Wellington Region =

Geology of a region in New Zealand

The Wellington region of New Zealand has a foundation of Torlesse Greywacke rocks, that make up the Tararua and Rimutaka Ranges, that go from Wellington in the south to the Manawatū Gorge, where they are renamed as the Ruahine Ranges, and continue further north-northeast, towards East Cape. To the west of the Tararua Ranges are the Manawatū coastal plains. To the east of the Ruahine Ranges is the Wairarapa-Masterton Basin, then the Eastern Uplands that border the eastern coast of the North Island from Cape Palliser to Napier.

To the east of the North Island is the Hikurangi Trough, a collision zone between the Pacific Plate and the Australian Plate. The Pacific Plate is being subducted under the Australian Plate, compressing the Wellington region, and causing the North Island Fault System, and a series of SSW-NNE trending basins and ranges, including the Tararua and Remutaka Ranges, and the Wairarapa-Masterton Basin. Successively newer rocks have been accreted to the east coast.

The Wellington region is prone to major earthquakes, the biggest in historical times being the magnitude 8.2 Wairarapa earthquake on 23 January 1855.

== Tectonics ==
Greywacke in the Wellington region was originally deposited in an accretionary wedge environment when the Paleo-Pacific plate was being subducted under the southeast margin of the continent of Gondwana around 230-200 Ma. After millions of years of subduction the sediments became buried to a depth of about 10 km, deep enough to be weakly metamorphosed, and accreted to the edge of Gondwana. Subduction ceased about 100 Ma, and by around 85 Ma a large strip of accreted terranes along the eastern margin of Gondwana rifted away and became the microcontinent of Zealandia. A relatively quiet tectonic period lasting about 60 Myr was followed by renewed tectonic activity, about 25 Ma, when the Pacific Plate began subducting under the Australian Plate.

In the Wellington region, subduction of the oceanic Pacific Plate beneath the continental Australian Plate commences at the Hikurangi Trough about 150 km east of Wellington, off the Wairarapa coast. The oblique plate convergence in the Wellington region is about 40 mm/yr at an azimuth of about 260°. The gently northwest-dipping subduction interface lies at a depth of about 25–30 km beneath the city.

Deformation resulting from the convergent collision between the Pacific and Australian plates is largely split into compressional uplift and downthrow, and strain that is stored and released roughly parallel to the Hikurangi Trough. A significant portion of the plate margin parallel strain component, especially in the southern North Island, is carried to the surface along a series of northeast-striking strike-slip faults known as the North Island Fault System. At least some of these faults, including the Wellington and Wairarapa faults, are thought to propagate all the way from the subduction interface to the surface. Smaller, secondary faults in the Wellington area have created a series of ridges and valleys, of which Matiu / Somes Island is an example of part of a drowned ridge uplifted to its present position.

== Basement rocks ==
All basement rocks beneath the Wellington region belong to the Torlesse Composite Terrane. They are largely composed of Greywacke (hardened sandstone and mudstone), but also contain Chert, and Pillow lavas.

In the Wellington region, the Torlesse Composite Terrane is composed of two subterranes, the Rakaia Terrane (late Triassic to early Jurassic, 230-180 Ma), to the west of the Ruahine Ranges, and the Pahau Terrane (late Jurassic to early Cretaceous, 180-100 Ma), to the east. Major faults such as the Wellington Fault and Wairarapa Fault lie close to the boundary between the terranes. At the boundary between these two terranes, is the Esk Head Belt, a 20 km wide melange of rocks, broken and deformed by earthquakes along the fault lines near the boundary.

Further to the east of the Wairarapa-Masterton Basin, are successively younger Cretaceous (140-65 Ma) sandstones and mudstones (sometimes called the Waioeka Terrane), that can be regarded as part of the Torlesse Composite Terrane. There seems to be some disagreement on where to place the boundary between basement rocks and overlying rocks, and the decision seems to be based on the degree of induration. In the east, even younger and softer sandstones and mudstones occur.

== Limestone ==
Pliocene (5-2 Ma) limestone occurs to the east of the Wairarapa-Masterton Basin, and around Pahiatua, and the Puketoi Range. Wellington is made of fault lines which cause many earthquakes every year.

== Earthquakes ==
The Wellington region is prone to major earthquakes. Significant earthquakes originating in or affecting the region include the Haowhenua earthquake in about 1460 AD, the 1848 Marlborough earthquake of magnitude 7.5, the magnitude 8.2 earthquake on 23 January 1855, the two 1942 Wairarapa earthquakes of magnitude 6.9 on 24 June 1942 and 6.8 on 1 August 1942, and the 2016 Kaikōura earthquake of magnitude 7.8 on 14 November 2016 (over half of the insurance losses from building damage were in Wellington City).

The 1848 Marlborough earthquake was a magnitude 7.5 earthquake that occurred at 1:40 a.m. on 16 October 1848 and whose epicentre was in the Marlborough region of the South Island of New Zealand. In Wellington, the shaking lasted for about two minutes and caused widespread damage, especially to brick or stone structures. Most of the buildings damaged in the earthquake were rebuilt in wood and this contributed to the relatively low level of damage and loss of life in the more powerful Wairarapa earthquake that hit Wellington seven years later.

The largest New Zealand earthquake in historical times was the 1855 magnitude 8.2 Wairarapa earthquake. Near the Wairarapa fault line, the beach rose about 6 m in this earthquake, and horizontal movement was about 12 m. Wellington's Basin Reserve sports ground sits on land lifted by this earthquake; the area had previously been part of a waterway that led into the harbour.

Major faults that may result in significant earthquakes in the Wellington region include the Alpine Fault, and the Marlborough fault system in the South Island, and the Ohariu Fault, Wellington Fault, Wairarapa Fault, Reikorangi Fault, Otaki Forks Fault, and Wairangi Fault in the North Island.

The Wairarapa Fault has an average horizontal slip rate of 6.7–10 mm/year, and vertical change of 1.7 mm/year. The Wellington fault and Awatere fault in the Marlborough fault system have similar rates of movement.

Beaches around Wellington and Turakirae Head show multiple raised platforms corresponding to previous earthquakes.

== Maps ==
Geological maps of New Zealand can be obtained from the New Zealand Institute of Geological and Nuclear Science (GNS Science), a New Zealand Government Research Institute.

GNS provides a free Map of New Zealand's Geological Foundations.

The main maps are the 1 : 250 000 QMap series, which will be completed as a series of 21 maps and booklets in 2010. Low resolution versions of these maps (without the associated booklet) can be downloaded from the GNS site for free. The map for the Wellington Area was published in 2000, and the map for the Wairarapa Area was published in 2002.

There is also a 1 : 50 000 geological map of the Wellington urban area, together with an associated booklet.

== See also ==
- Geology of New Zealand
- North Island Fault System
