= 1942 Wairarapa earthquakes =

Earthquakes in New Zealand

- Location within New Zealand
- UTC time: 1942-06-24 11:16:30
- 1942-08-01 12:34:06
- ISC event: 900349
- 900404
- USGS-ANSS: ComCat
- ComCat
- Local date: 24 June 1942; 2 August 1942
- Local time: 23:16
- 12:34
- Magnitude: 6.9–7.2 M_{w}
- 6.8 M_{w}
- Depth: 12 km (7.5 mi)
- Epicentre: 40.96°S 175.69°E
- Areas affected: New Zealand, North Island
- Casualties: one death

Two 1942 Wairarapa earthquakes shook the lower North Island of New Zealand on 24 June and 2 August. They were large and shallow with epicentres close together east of Masterton in the Wairarapa region. The June earthquake was sometimes referred to as the Masterton earthquake but both caused damage over a wide area, from Dannevirke and Eketāhuna over to Whanganui and down to Ōtaki and Wellington. There was one death in Wellington, on 24 June.

The August earthquake can be regarded as an aftershock of the June earthquake. Both earthquakes were preceded by smaller foreshocks. As the second quake was slightly less in magnitude than the first, they were not an earthquake doublet where the second quake is slightly larger. The August earthquake was considerably deeper (40 km, not 12 km), though another source gives the depths as 43 km and 15 km. There was another large aftershock on 2 December and one in February 1943.

== The Wairarapa region ==
The region had already experienced several large earthquakes, the very large 1855 Wairarapa earthquake, and the 1934 Pahiatua earthquake in the Northern Wairarapa.

The 1855 earthquake occurred on the Wairarapa Fault which is part of the North Island Fault System.

== 24 June 1942 ==
At 11.16 pm, a small and sharp but brief earthquake of magnitude 7.2 M_{s} (M_{w} 6.9–7.2) shook a wide area in the lower North Island from Eketāhuna to Masterton, Featherston, and Wellington; and was noticed from Auckland to near Dunedin. The main earthquake was 7.2 M_{s} and the epicentre was near Masterton and 12 km deep. The quake lasted for over a minute and was preceded by a foreshock three hours earlier at 8.15 pm.

Many buildings were damaged in Masterton. The mayor Thomas Jordan declared a state of emergency and got troops to patrol the town. There was considerable damage in Palmerston North.

Twenty thousand chimneys fell in Wellington and there was one death in Kelburn, where a 70-year old retired chemist, Hedley Victor Evens, was killed by coal gas from a fractured pipe. Some downtown pediments were damaged, but some had already been removed after the 1931 Hawke's Bay earthquake. The city engineer K. E. Luke said that damage was less severe as the quake ended swiftly.

== 2 August 1942 ==
Another shock in the area struck on 2 August at 12.34 pm, preceded by a foreshock on the late afternoon of the 1st. This was of magnitude 7.0 M_{s} (M_{w} 6.8) or slightly less than the earlier quake. The epicentre was 40 km deep and at location 41.01°S and 175.52°E.

The settlement of Eketāhuna did not suffer as badly, though in Masterton, the June damage was exacerbated. The 2 August aftershock was followed by a third severe aftershock on 2 December, with about 600 aftershocks recorded to the end of the year.

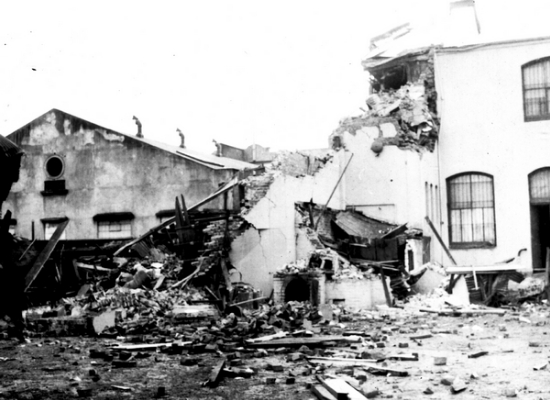
A building damaged in the 1942 Wairarapa earthquakes

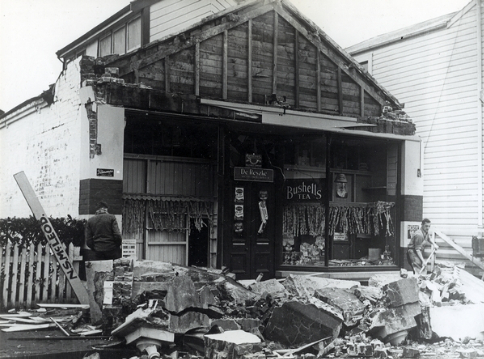
A shop in Greytown after the 1942 Wairarapa earthquake

== Damage ==
Repairs from the first quake were not completed, and the mortar for some repairs had not been properly set. Some buildings weakened in June suffered further damage, though it was sometimes hard to tell if further damage had occurred.

In Masterton many buildings were badly damaged by the first quake; the fire station, the Bank of New Zealand, several shops, and St Matthew's Church (which was later blown up by the Army). The Waiohine River's road-bridge on State Highway 2 was badly sunken and was closed. After the second quake, Masterton's WFCA building partly collapsed.

In Wellington, the first quake toppled some twenty thousand chimneys. In August, there was serious damage near the Willis Street–Manners Street junction to three buildings: Charles Begg's music shop, the Duke of Edinburgh Hotel, and the Regent Hotel. Manners Street between Willis and Cuba Streets was closed for several months.

A Wellington Hospital nurse was lucky to be on night duty as a chimney crashed onto her bed. At Porirua Lunatic Asylum (mental hospital), 800 patients had to be transferred to other hospitals.

== Overall cost and effect ==
The cost of the damage from these two quakes was more than £2 million (pounds), a considerable amount for a war-straitened economy. In Masterton damage from the two quakes was still apparent some 12 years later.

Another result was the establishment by the government of the Earthquake Commission in 1945.

== See also ==
- List of earthquakes in 1942
- List of earthquakes in New Zealand
