= Seismotectonics =

Seismotectonics is the study of the relationship between the earthquakes, active tectonics and individual faults of a region. It seeks to understand which faults are responsible for seismic activity in an area by analysing a combination of regional tectonics, recent instrumentally recorded events, accounts of historical earthquakes and geomorphological evidence. This information can then be used to quantify the seismic hazard of an area.

== Methodology ==
A seismotectonic analysis of an area often involves the integration of disparate datasets.

=== Regional tectonics ===
An understanding of the regional tectonics of an area is likely to be derived from published geological maps, research publications on the geological structure and seismic reflection profiles, where available, augmented by other geophysical data.

In order to understand the seismic hazard of an area it is necessary not only to know where potentially active faults are, but also the orientation of the stress field. This is normally derived from a combination of earthquake data, borehole breakout analysis, direct stress measurement and the analysis of geologically young fault networks. The World Stress Map Project provides a useful online compilation of such data.

=== Earthquakes ===
==== Instrumentally recorded events ====
Since the early 20th century, sufficient information has been available from seismometers to allow the location, depth and magnitude of earthquakes to be calculated. In terms of identifying the fault responsible for an earthquake where there is no clear surface trace, recording the locations of aftershocks generally gives a strong indication of the strike of the fault.

In the last 30 years, it has been possible to routinely calculate focal mechanisms from teleseismic data. Catalogues of events with calculated focal mechanisms are now available online, such as the searchable catalogue from the NEIC. As focal mechanisms give two potential active fault plane orientations, other evidence is required to interpret the origin of an individual event. Although only available for a restricted time period, in areas of moderate to intense seismicity there is probably sufficient data to characterise the type of seismicity in an area, if not all the active structures.

==== Historical records ====
Attempts to understand the seismicity of an area require information from earthquakes before the era of instrumental recording. This requires a careful assessment of historical data in terms of their reliability. In most cases, all that can be derived is an estimate of the location and magnitude of the event. However, such data is needed to fill the gaps in the instrumental record, particularly in areas with either relatively low seismicity or where the repeat periods for major earthquakes is more than a hundred years.

=== Field investigations ===
Information on the timing and magnitude of seismic events that occurred before instrumental recording can be obtained from excavations across faults that are thought to be seismically active and by studying recent sedimentary sequences for evidence of seismic activity such as seismites or tsunami deposits.

=== Geomorphology ===
Seismically active faults and related fault generated folds have a direct effect on the geomorphology of a region. This may allow the direct identification of active structures not previously known. In some cases such observations can be used quantitatively to constrain the repeat period of major earthquakes, such as the raised beaches of Turakirae Head recording the history of coseismic uplift of the Rimutaka Range due to displacement on the Wairarapa Fault in North Island, New Zealand.

== See also ==
- Seismology
- Plate tectonics
