= Wellington Harbour =

Harbour in Wellington, New Zealand

- Port Nicholson
- Te Whanganui-a-Tara (Māori)
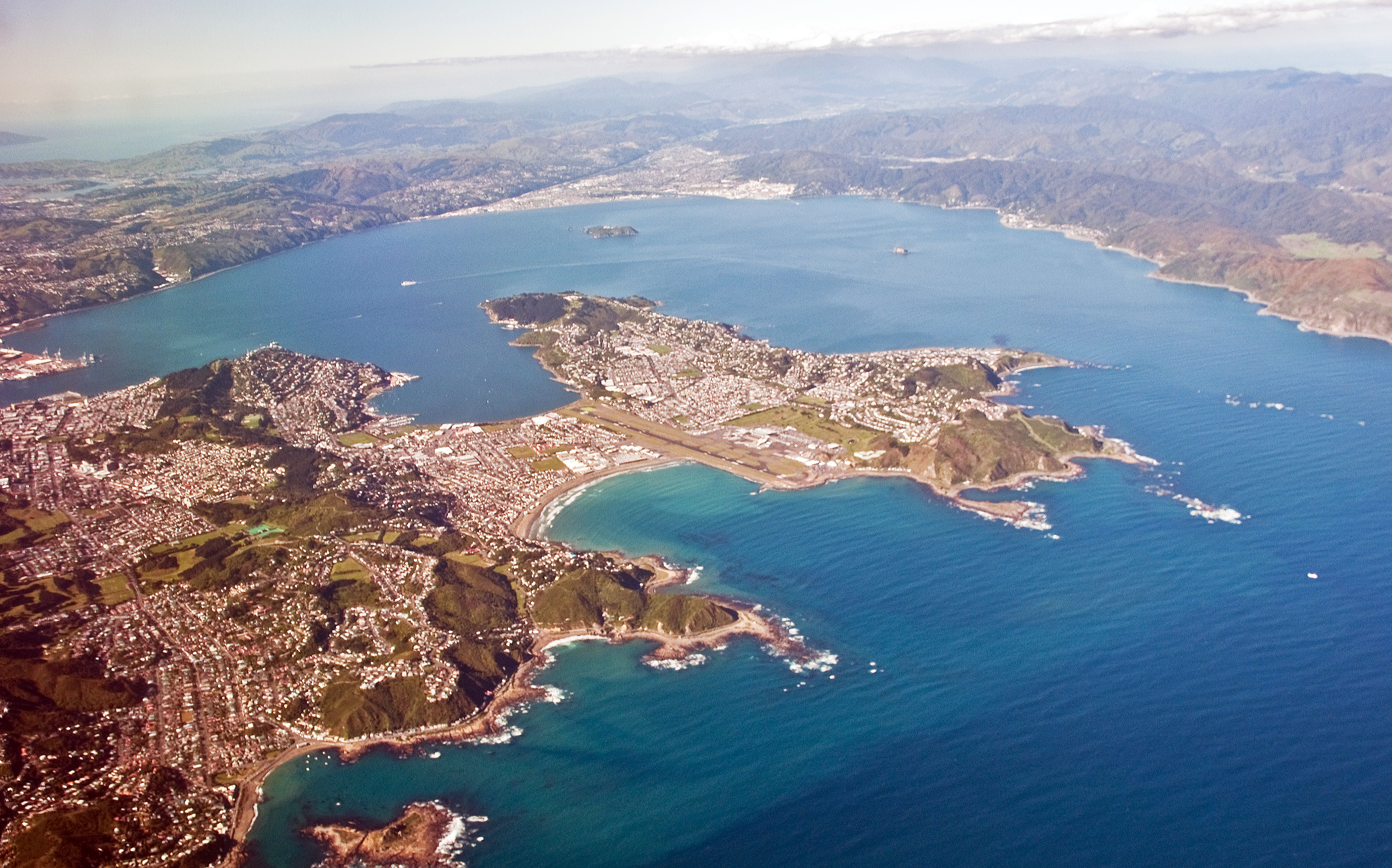
- Looking north-east over Wellington Harbour from above Cook Strait; Left to right: Lambton Harbour, Miramar Peninsula and the harbour entrance

- Location in New Zealand
- Location: Wellington, New Zealand
- Coordinates: 41°16′S 174°51′E
- Type: Natural harbour
- River sources: Hutt River
- Ocean/sea sources: Cook Strait

Wellington Harbour (Māori: Te Whanganui-a-Tara [tɛ ˈfaŋanʉi a ˈtaɾa]), officially called Wellington Harbour / Port Nicholson, is a large natural harbour on the southern tip of New Zealand's North Island. The harbour entrance is from Cook Strait. Central Wellington is located on parts of the western and southern sides of the harbour, and the suburban area of Lower Hutt is to the north and east.

The harbour area bounded by a line between Pencarrow Head to Petone foreshore, was officially named Port Nicholson until it assumed its current dual name in 1984.

== Toponymy ==
The earliest known Māori name for the area, Te Upoko-o-te-Ika-a-Māui, is derived from Māori legend and translates literally as "the head of Māui's fish". According to Māori legend, a giant fish was hooked and pulled to the surface by Polynesian navigator Māui and the fish turned into land which became the North Island. The older name is still used in some circumstances for the city or the region, such as the former Māori name of Victoria University of Wellington, which was Te Whare Wānanga o te Ūpoko o te Ika a Māui until 2018.

Te Whanganui-a-Tara, another Māori name for the area, translates literally as "the great harbour of Tara". It is believed to refer to Tara, a son of the Polynesian explorer Whātonga, who was sent down from the Māhia Peninsula by his father to explore southern lands for their people to settle.

Captain James Herd is said to have named the harbour "Port Nicholson" after Sydney's harbourmaster Captain John Nicholson. However, while Herd is attributed as the creator of the first charts to ascribe the name "Port Nicholson" to the harbour, it is likely that Captain John Rodolphus Kent of the cutter Mermaid had entered the harbour in 1824, and named it after the harbourmaster, his superior officer. A further Māori name for Wellington, Pōneke, is said to be a transliteration of Port Nick (Port Nicholson).

An alternative suggested etymology for the name Pōneke states that it derives from a shortening of the Māori phrase pō nekeneke, meaning "the journey into the night", in reference to the exodus of Te Āti Awa after they were displaced from the Wellington area by the first Europeans. However, the name Pōneke was already in use by February 1842, earlier than the displacement is said to have occurred.

William Wakefield is thought to have named the harbour Lambton Harbour in 1839 in honour of the Earl of Durham, who had the family name of "Lambton". Alternatively, it could have been named for the Lambton, a cutter commanded by Captain Barnett, who in 1826 had produced one of the earliest charts of the harbour. The name Lambton Harbour is typically used to describe the area of Wellington Harbour close to the Wellington central business district.

== Mythology ==
=== Legend of Te Whanganui-a-Tara ===
According to legend, the harbour of Te Whanganui-a-Tara was created by two taniwha (nature guardian spirits), Whātaitai (or Hataitai) and Ngake. Whataitai lived in the north of the lake where the harbour now is, and was gentle. Ngake, who lived further south, was more violent. Ngake could hear the waters of Raukawa Moana (Cook Strait) pounding to the south, and decided to escape the lake to get to it. He went to the north of the lake to build up his speed for the attempt, then headed off rapidly towards the south. Ngake crashed into and through the rocks at Seatoun and headed out into the Strait. Barrett Reef is said to be the debris left from Ngake's escape. This was seen by Whataitai, who tried to follow Ngake out of the new entrance. The water was now running out of the lake, however, and Whataitai became stranded in the shallows. He stayed there for many generations before being lifted high onto the land by a great earthquake. The soul of Whataitai left him in the form of a bird, Te Keo, and his body formed the isthmus of land where Wellington Airport is now located. It flew high above the harbour and wept for the taniwha, whose body was lifted high onto the hills close to the harbour entrance. To this day, Mount Victoria is known to Māori as Tangi Te Keo, "The weeping of Te Keo", and the suburb on the hills immediately below it is named Hataitai.

== History ==
=== Pre-European history ===
According to Māori oral history, Wellington Harbour was first discovered by the legendary explorer Kupe, who is said to have visited around 1200–1300 CE. A number of place names in the area commemorate Kupe, such as Te Tangihanga o Kupe or Te Raranga o Kupe (Barrett Reef), and Te Aroaro o Kupe or Te Ure o Kupe (Steeple Rock). Two islands in the harbour, Mākaro (Ward Island) and Matiu (Somes Island), are named after his daughters or nieces.

Kupe was followed to the area by Tara and Tautoki, sons of the legendary explorer Whātonga, who settled there from the Hawke's Bay. Tara is remembered in the names of both the harbour and the first iwi (tribe) to settle there permanently, Ngāi Tara. Ngāi Tara mostly lived on Motukarangi (now Miramar Peninsular), with some settlements near Te Awa Kairangi (Hutt River). Much of the land around the harbour was densely forested, with many birds, fish and eel in the river, and shellfish at the river mouth. Māori used waka (canoes) to navigate the harbour and rivers and access food.

Over the next few centuries, a succession of iwi migrated down the east coast of the North Island to occupy the harbour. They included Ngāti Mamoe, Ngāi Tahu, and Ngāti Ira, who were an amalgamation of Ngāti Kahungunu, Ngāti Kuia, Ngāti Kura and others. These migrations were relatively peaceful, achieved with intermarriage rather than fighting between iwi. At the beginning of the nineteenth century, Ngāti Ira lived in the eastern harbour between Waiwhetu and Turakirae Head, while the western harbour was largely deserted.

The 1820s and 1830s were a period of great unrest around the harbour. In 1820, a taua (war party) led by Ngāpuhi with groups from Ngāti Toa and Te Āti Awa raided the Ngāti Ira settlements in Te Whanganui-a-Tara and the Hutt Valley, resulting in heavy losses for Ngāti Ira. Between 1824 and 1826, a large group of Te Āti Awa migrated from Taranaki to the harbour. Ngāti Mutunga and Ngāti Tama, both iwi related to Te Āti Awa, first settled in the area between Te Aro and Kaiwharawhara.. They slowly gained control of the eastern harbour, forcing Ngāti Ira to leave for the Wairarapa. In 1831, a further group of Te Āti Awa moved to the harbour after their great pa in Taranaki was captured in battle. Led by rangatira (chiefs) Te Wharepouri and Te Puni, they settled along the shore from Kaiwharawhara to Hikoikoi. In 1835, Ngāti Mutunga and Ngāti Tama left the harbour for the Chatham Islands.Te Āti Awa continued to be in conflict with Ngāti Kahungunu until 1840.

=== Modern history ===
During his voyage on HMS Resolution, James Cook passed by the entrance to the harbour on 2 November 1773, and then put about, in an attempt to see what lay within the entrance. He anchored a mile from Barrett Reef, and made some brief observations noting that it appeared to be a sheltered harbour. A wind change led him to leave the area, and there were no further observations from European explorers for the next 50 years.

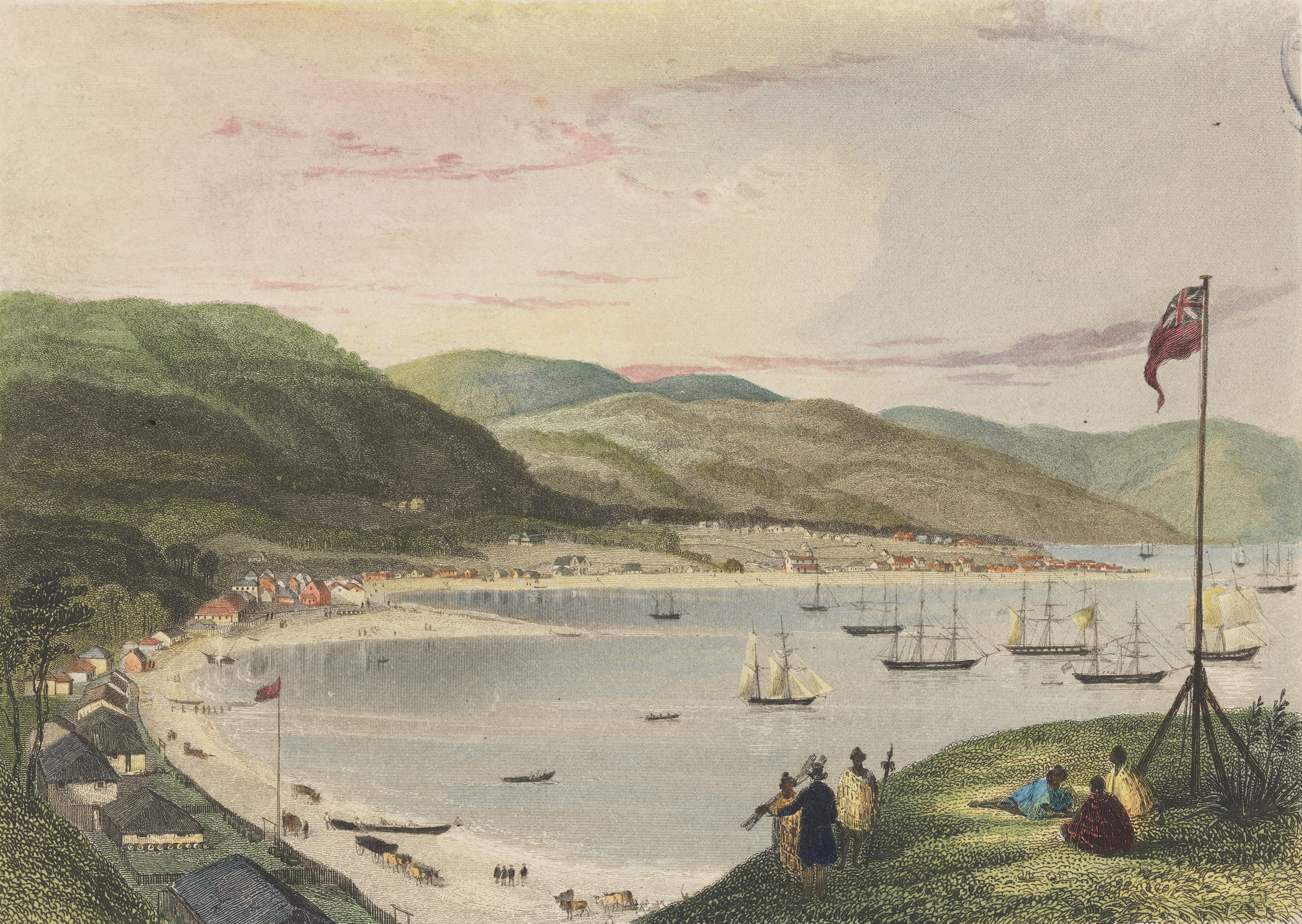
Lambton Harbour, Port Nicholson, Wellington, New Zealand, ca. 1840

In 1826, Captain James Herd entered the harbour on the barque Rosanna, along with Captain Barnett of the cutter Lambton. Both subsequently made charts of the harbour.

The New Zealand Company established settlements in Petone and Wellington from 1840.

The 1855 Wairarapa earthquake uplifted the north-western side of the harbour. This led to reclamation in the harbour, which increased the availability of flat land for Wellington City.

In 1968, the inter-island passenger ferry Wahine grounded at Barrett Reef, near the harbour entrance, during a storm. Fifty-one people died at the time and two more died much later from injuries suffered that day.

=== Harbour defences ===
Coastal fortifications were constructed around Wellington Harbour as part of nationwide defence preparations in the 1880s as a response to fears of an attack by Russia, and then during World War II because of fears of invasion by the Japanese. Fort Ballance was built in 1885 on the spur between Mahanga Bay and Scorching Bay on the Miramar Peninsula. At the time, Fort Ballance was Wellington's main fortification, and was supported by coastal artillery at Kau Point Battery and Point Halswell. When fully armed, Fort Ballance had more guns than any of the other coastal fortifications nationwide. Fortifications to protect the inner harbour were also built at Fort Kelburne at Ngauranga, and at Fort Buckley above Kaiwharawhara, between 1885 and 1887.

HMS Poneke was one of four Defender class spar torpedo boats built by Thornycroft & Company in London. Poneke (yard number 171) was allocated for the defence of Wellington Harbour. It was commissioned in 1883 and shipped to New Zealand, arriving in Wellington in late August 1884. A Torpedo Corp was formed to operate the boat, but it never engaged an enemy vessel. The torpedo boat was declared obsolete in March 1899.

In the 1890s a minefield was laid between Ward Island and Point Gordon. The mines could be detonated remotely from a control point beneath Fort Ballance. The minefield was decommissioned in 1907 and some of the mines were detonated in public displays.

Fort Dorset was a defence site established in 1908 at Point Dorset, the easternmost point of the Miramar Peninsula and the narrowest part of the entrance to Wellington Harbour. The fort consisted of gun batteries, administration and accommodation blocks and a parade ground, and was in use by the army for most of the twentieth century. The military accommodation was closed in 1991 and the camp was demolished in 1998.

Additional defences were constructed during World War II. Fort Opau was a gun emplacement constructed in 1941 on a high headland above Mākara on Wellington's west coast, protecting Cook Strait and the western approach to Wellington Harbour. It never fired on any enemy vessels and was decommissioned in 1944.

In 1941 an anti-submarine boom almost two km long made from two rows of piles connected with wooden planks was built between Eastbourne and Ward Island. A steel net hanging from buoys was strung across the harbour from Ward Island to Miramar Peninsula to stop enemy submarines and mines. There was a gate to allow sea traffic to pass, but each vessel had to be checked by the "gate-ship". The net was removed at the end of the war, and the boom was removed in 1948. in conjunction with the boom, a minefield was laid out between Ward Island and Scorching Bay in November 1942, controlled from Worser Bay. The mines were detonated in July 1944.

In 1942, Matiu / Somes Island was fortified with heavy anti-aircraft gun emplacements on the summit, but they were never used. Wrights Hill Fortress is a hilltop coastal artillery battery built between 1942 and 1944 in the suburb of Karori, overlooking Wellington Harbour and Cook Strait. It is predominantly underground, with numerous tunnels linking the war shelters, gun emplacements, magazines, plotting rooms and engine room. The fort was intended to house three 9.2" Mk. XV guns, but only two guns were installed and the fort never saw action.

From 1940 to 1957, the coastal defence batteries around Wellington were controlled by the 10th Coast Regiment, Royal New Zealand Artillery of the New Zealand Army.

== Geography and geology ==
=== Setting ===
Wellington Harbour is a natural harbour with an area of around 76 km^{2}, with an entrance from Cook Strait at its southern end between Pencarrow Head and Palmer Head on the southern tip of Miramar Peninsula. The harbour has a maximum length of over 11 kilometres and a width of 9.25 kilometres, and the entrance is over 1.6 kilometres wide from shore to shore.

The shipping channel through the harbour entrance lies between Barrett Reef on the western side, and Pencarrow Head to the east. Barrett Reef is a cluster of rocks that is partly exposed even at high tide. It has been the site of a large number of shipwrecks. The most serious loss caused by impact with Barrett Reef is the sinking of the inter-island ferry TEV Wahine in 1968, with the loss of 53 lives.

Wellington Harbour provides sheltered anchorage in a region where wind velocities may exceed 160 km/h. The depth of water over most of the harbour exceeds 20 metres or 10 fathoms.

There are two main bays within the harbour, Evans Bay and Lambton Harbour. The small Oriental Bay to the north of Mount Victoria features beaches and cafes. The suburbs of Wellington city are spread around the low lying terrain immediately surrounding the harbour, and the hills overlooking the west and south-west of the harbour. Lambton Harbour is surrounded by the reclaimed land of Wellington's central business district and contains the majority of the city's port facilities. Evans Bay lies between Mt Victoria and the Miramar Peninsula, and is below the flight path to low-lying Wellington Airport.

To the east of the harbour lie several small bays, most of which are populated by small coastal communities. The largest of these suburban settlements is Eastbourne, directly to the east of the northern tip of the Miramar Peninsula.

The Hutt River enters the harbour at Waiwhetū. In Wellington city, many small creeks or streams including the Kumutoto, Waitangi and Waipapa streams formerly reached the harbour but were culverted many years ago.

The small islands Matiu / Somes Island, Mākaro / Ward Island and Mokopuna Island are located within the harbour.

=== Geology ===
The harbour is of seismic origin, and a major earthquake fault line (the Wellington Fault) lies along its western shore. In 2014 another fault line (the Aotea Fault) was discovered extending from Oriental Bay into the harbour. At the northern end of the harbour lies the narrow triangular plain of the Hutt River, which largely follows the line of the earthquake fault to the north-east. The city of Lower Hutt is located on this plain.

Māori oral history recounts that there used to be two channels at the entrance to the harbour. The present entrance was called Te Au-a-Tane and a western channel (now the Rongotai isthmus) was called Te-Awa-a-Taia. Between the two channels lay the island of Motu-Kairangi (present day Miramar Peninsula). Then a violent earthquake known as Haowhenua (Māori for 'land swallower') uplifted the land so that the Te-Awa-a-Taia channel dried up and the island of Motu-Kairangi became joined to the mainland. Researchers have concluded that the earthquake happened around 1460AD.

==== Tsunami ====
Although the harbour is almost entirely surrounded by land, several tsunami have been recorded within it. The 1855 Wairarapa earthquake caused a tsunami 3-4-metres high which entered Wellington harbour through the harbour entrance. In August 1868, the Arica earthquake in South America causes unusual changes in water levels in the harbour. A gravel bar appeared at Ngauranga, and water almost reached the street at Te Aro. In May 1877, the Iquique earthquake in South America caused water to rush into the harbour, and water levels rose and fell dramatically around the harbour for hours.

==== Waiwhetu Aquifer ====
The Waiwhetu Aquifer is a pressurized zone of water-retaining sand, gravel and boulders beneath the Hutt Valley and Wellington Harbour, which provides around 40 percent of the Wellington Region's annual water supply. The harbour basin contains massive quantities of gravel washed down from the Hutt River, in some places hundreds of metres deep. Above the gravel is a layer of mud and silt which seals fresh water within the gravel, creating an artesian aquifer. There are several aquifers in the area in different layers underground, but the Waiwhetu Aquifer is the largest and most productive one. Water flows down into the aquifer from a five-kilometre stretch of the Hutt River south of Taita Gorge, and rainwater also contributes to the aquifer. South of Melling the aquifer becomes pressurized by the layer of mud and silt above the gravel layer holding the water in, meaning that if a bore is sunk into the aquifer, water will rise up the pipe. Water from the aquifer also reaches the surface through natural springs at various places around the harbour. Pressure within the aquifer stops sea water from getting into the aquifer.

The water level in Wellington Harbour was much lower 20,000 years ago, and the ancient Hutt River used to flow down a paleochannel to the east of Matiu / Somes Island as far as the present-day Miramar Peninsula. Much of the water in the Waiwhetu aquifer moves under the sea bed from the direction of the Hutt River to the Falcon Shoals area (between Karaka Bay and Worser Bay) at the harbour mouth via the paleochannel. The characteristics of the aquifer between Matiu / Somes Island and the harbour mouth are not as well studied as the portion to the north of the island.

=== Reclamations ===
Lambton Harbour and Aotea Quay

Reclamation of Wellington Harbour started in the 1850s, in order to increase the amount of usable land for the then new City of Wellington. Land plots in the early city were scarce, with little room for public buildings and parks, as well as inadequate dockside areas for shipping. Reclamation progressively advanced into the harbour throughout the 19th and 20th centuries, providing room for public, commercial and industrial areas for the city.

== Marine life ==
=== Fish ===
Fish species commonly caught in the harbour by recreational fishers include red cod, kahawai, gurnard, tarakihi, snapper, trevally, elephant fish and kingfish. Children enjoy catching spotties. Eagle rays and stingrays can both be found in the harbour: eagle rays are often seen in the shallow water around Whairepo Lagoon, which was named after the Māori name for the species. Several species of octopus live in the harbour. In the late nineteenth and early twentieth centuries, large octopuses would occasionally grab people at the water's edge. Rig sharks visit the harbour each year to mate and give birth. Other species seen less often include basking sharks, blue sharks and seven-gilled sharks.

=== Marine mammals ===
Common dolphins and orca visit the harbour quite often. In the nineteenth century, southern right whales bred within Wellington Harbour, but in the 21st century sightings are much rarer. Humpback whales are also seen occasionally. There is a fur seal colony at Pariwhero / Red Rocks on the south coast facing Cook Strait, and seals sometimes appear in and around the harbour. Vagrant and rare marine mammal visitors include leopard seals (reclassified from vagrant to resident in 2019), crabeater seals, and an elephant seal nicknamed 'Blossom' that hung around the harbour for several years in the 1960s.

=== Plants and sponges ===
Over 100 species of seaweed are found in Wellington Harbour. Rocky shores around the harbour support kelp forests, for example at Kau Bay, but rising sea temperatures may be affecting the health of these areas. Sponge beds are found in deeper parts of the harbour.

=== Birds ===
Between 2018 and 2022, annual surveys were made of indigenous coastal birdlife along the coastlines of the south coast and the western side of Wellington Harbour. Thirty-four native or endemic species and 14 naturalised introduced species were observed, though some of these were only seen on the south coast and not within the harbour. The surveys showed that stretches of the coastline "hardened" by reclamation or seawall construction have lower densities of birds and less diversity of species, probably due to the steepness of the shoreline and lack of intertidal foraging habitats. Changes to average sea level and temperature may affect some species in the future. Black-backed gulls, red-billed gulls and several species of shags are found all around the harbour. A breeding population of fluttering shearwaters has been established on Matiu / Somes Island. Little blue penguins are found in many locations, with nesting boxes provided in some places to encourage them.

== Environmental protection ==
As part of maintaining a healthy marine environment, Greater Wellington Regional Council and the National Institute of Water and Atmospheric Research (NIWA) have monitored water quality in Wellington Harbour since 2016. Water quality is affected by sediment, nutrients and pollutants from the whole catchment around the harbour, turbidity caused by rainfall and outflow from the Hutt River, and tides.

The Ministry of Agriculture and Forestry and NIWA have carried out surveillance on non-indigenous marine species which may arrive in the harbour in water ballast or attached to hulls of ships. Examples of marine pests found in the harbour include the Northern Pacific sea star and wakame, a seaweed native to the north-west Pacific Ocean, which was first found in Wellington Harbour in 1987. It grows rapidly and can displace native species of seaweed.

Volunteers from the group Ghost Diving organise regular harbour clean-ups, collecting tonnes of rubbish from the water around the inner-city waterfront and bringing attention to the problem of littering.

== Transport ==
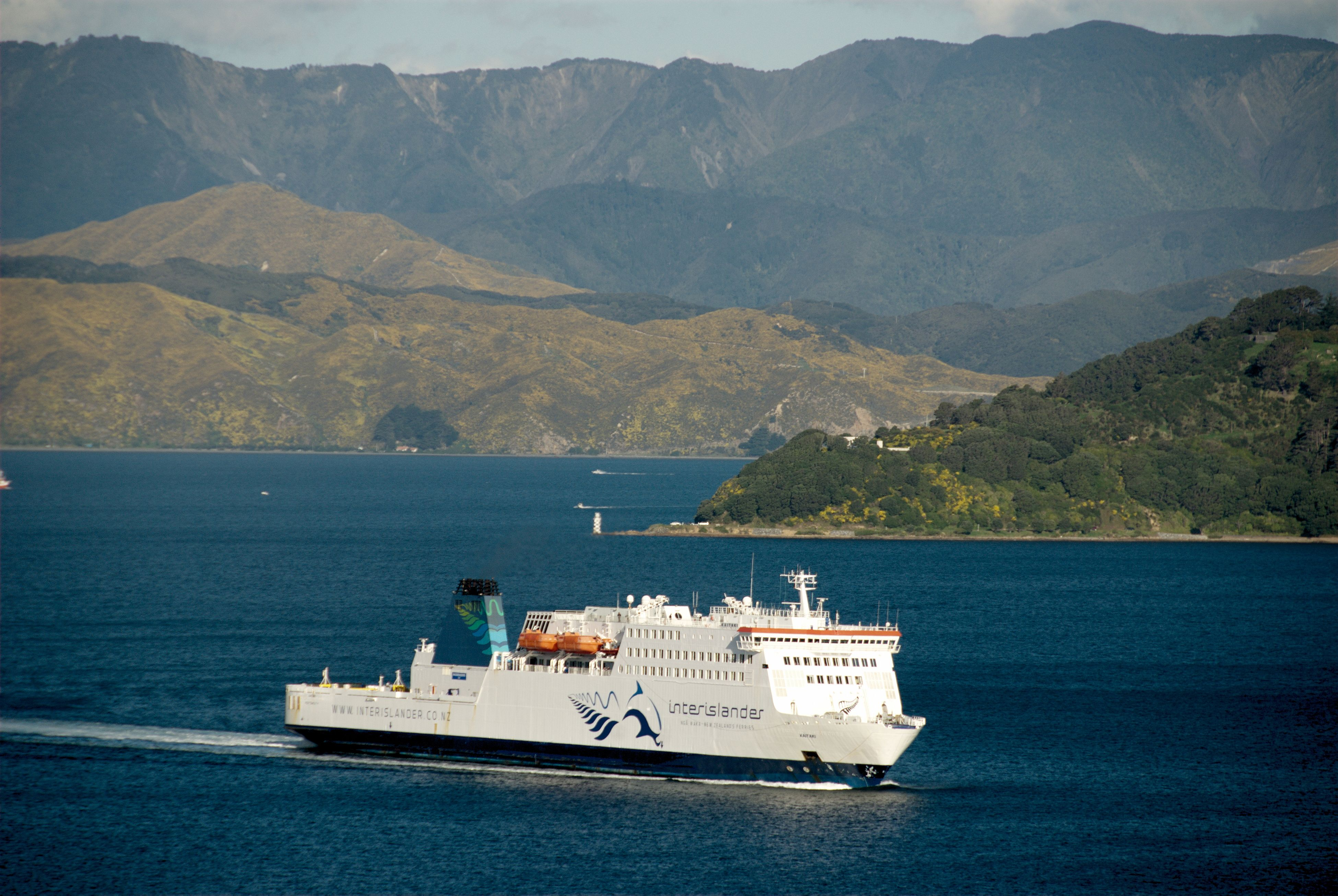
Ferry Kaitaki in the harbour

Wellington Harbour is a significant port serving the lower North Island, with the Regional Council-owned company CentrePort recording around 14,000 commercial shipping movements each year. In 2023, CentrePort ranked seventh out of eleven container ports in New Zealand, by container TEU throughput. In 2023, CentrePort ranked third highest port by number of cruise ship visits, with 89 ships calling. CentrePort operates the fuel tanker wharf at Seaview in Lower Hutt.

Wellington harbour ferries first began operating at the end of the 19th century and regular crossings from central Wellington to Days Bay continue today. The harbour is also used by inter-island ferries linking Wellington to Picton.

A project to develop a walking and cycling route around the harbour, the Great Harbour Way, is gathering momentum. Te Ara Tupua is a cycling and walking path being built from Melling in the Hutt Valley to central Wellington.

== Wharves ==
As of 2025, there are 20 wharves situated around Wellington Harbour. This includes large wharves in the inner harbour and port area, smaller wharves in seaside suburbs and the fuel wharves at Point Howard and Evans Bay. The first wharves were built from 1840 by newly arrived European settlers, to enable them to move goods from ship to shore. The first publicly owned wharf built in Wellington Harbour was Queens Wharf, completed in 1862. In 1880 the Wellington Harbour Board was created and took control of most wharves in the harbour until its disestablishment in 1989. Wharves were built for various purposes – moving fuel, primary products such as timber, wool and meat coming from the hinterland, other goods and passengers. Wharves for passenger ferries included ferries taking commuters and day trippers to and from the city and suburbs, and larger inter-island ferries going to Picton and Lyttelton. The wharves also serviced passenger liners from overseas, and TEAL flying boats.

On the disestablishment of the Wellington Harbour Board in 1989, a commercial company, Port of Wellington (now called CentrePort Wellington) took over management of most industrial wharves, while Wellington City Council and Hutt City Council gained control of most suburban wharves. Over time Wellington's wharves have been altered, upgraded, extended, truncated or buried in reclamation along the shoreline of Wellington Harbour. Many wharves have been repurposed in response to changing domestic and international conditions and requirements for maritime transport of passengers and cargo.

== Recreation ==
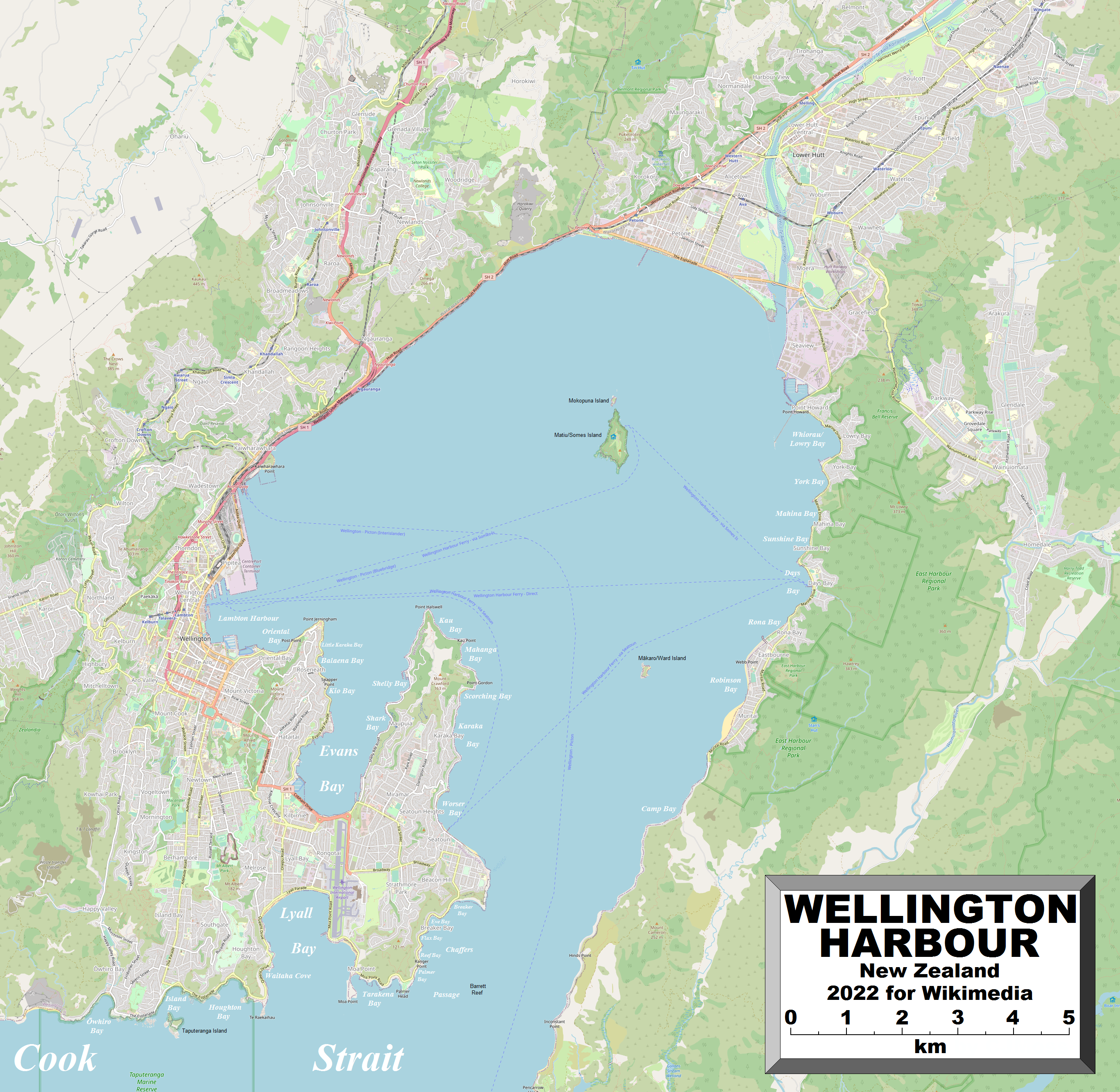
Detailed map of Wellington Harbour

Wellington's south coast and harbour entrance are exposed to open sea, providing places to dive and fish. There are also fishing spots at the rocks and reclamations within the harbour.

Harbour beaches like Oriental Bay, Petone, Days Bay and Hataitai Beach are suited to swimming and sunbathing.

The harbour accommodates a range of activities, with five water ski lanes, an area for personal water craft and areas for windsurfing. Several rowing, waka ama and yachting clubs operate from the harbour.

Small boat craft can anchor at Mākaro / Ward Island and Mokopuna Island and can also visit the Matiu / Somes Island reserve during daylight hours. Harbour cruises also travel regularly between the main Wellington waterfront, Matiu / Somes Island, Days Bay and Petone.

== In the arts ==
In 1974, the New Zealand author Denis Glover published the anthology Wellington Harbour, containing poems about or inspired by views of the harbour.

Big weather is an anthology of 100 poems about Wellington's harbour, hills, and environment. It was published in 2009 and in later editions.

The Wellington Writers Walk is a series of 23 quotations from New Zealand poets, novelists, and playwrights, installed along the Wellington waterfront in the form of contemporary concrete plaques or inlaid metal text on wooden 'benchmarks'. The plaques celebrate the lives and works of these well-known writers, all of whom had (or have) some connection to Wellington. Many of the quotations reference the harbour.

== Gallery ==
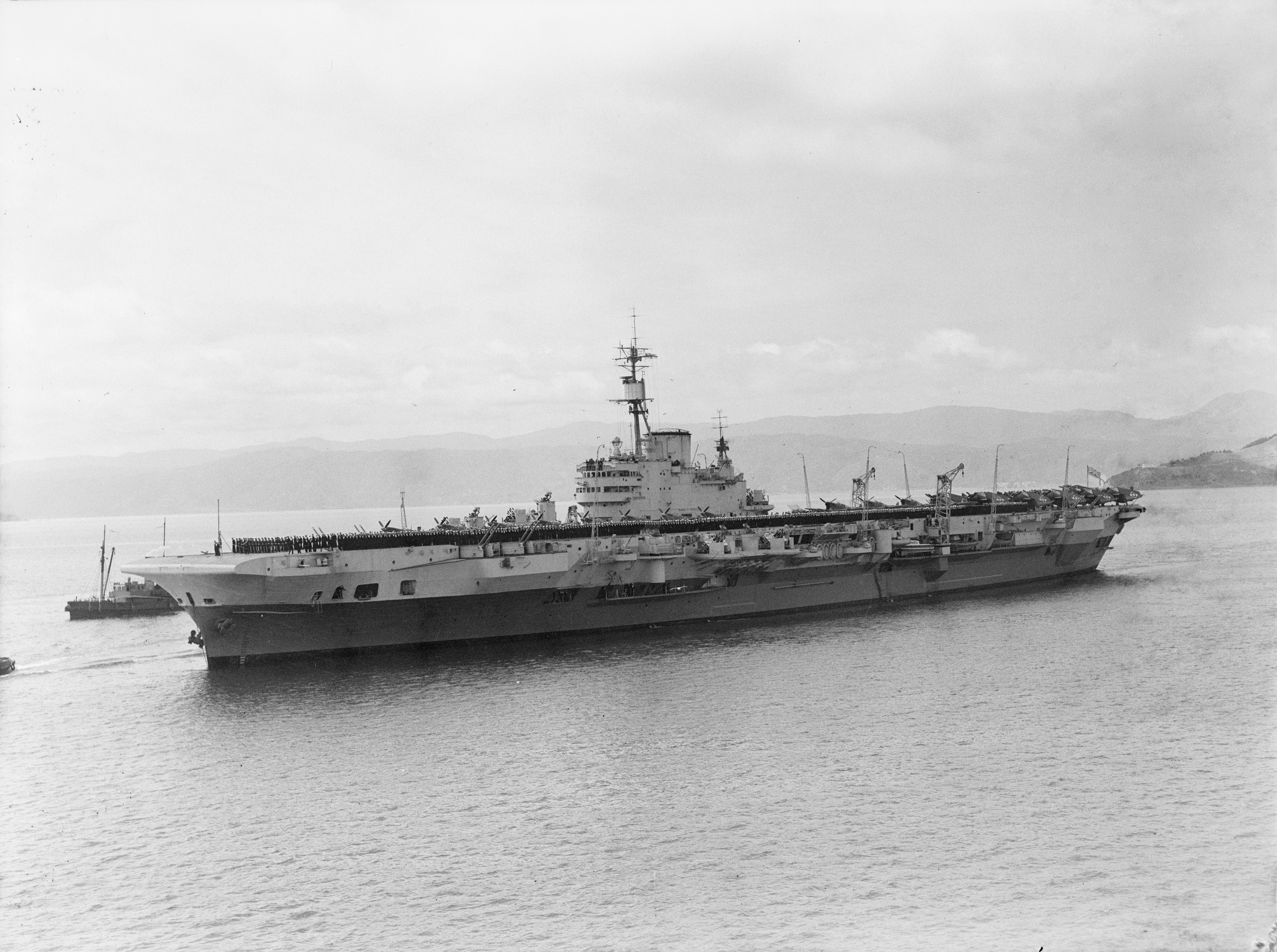
HMS Indefatigable, 1945

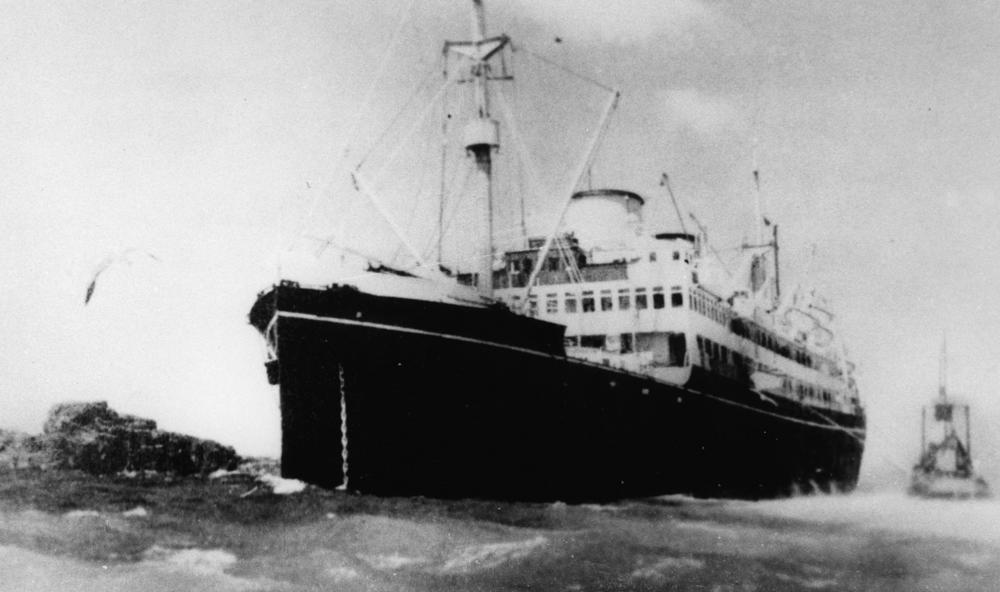
MS Wanganella being towed from an entrance reef, 1947

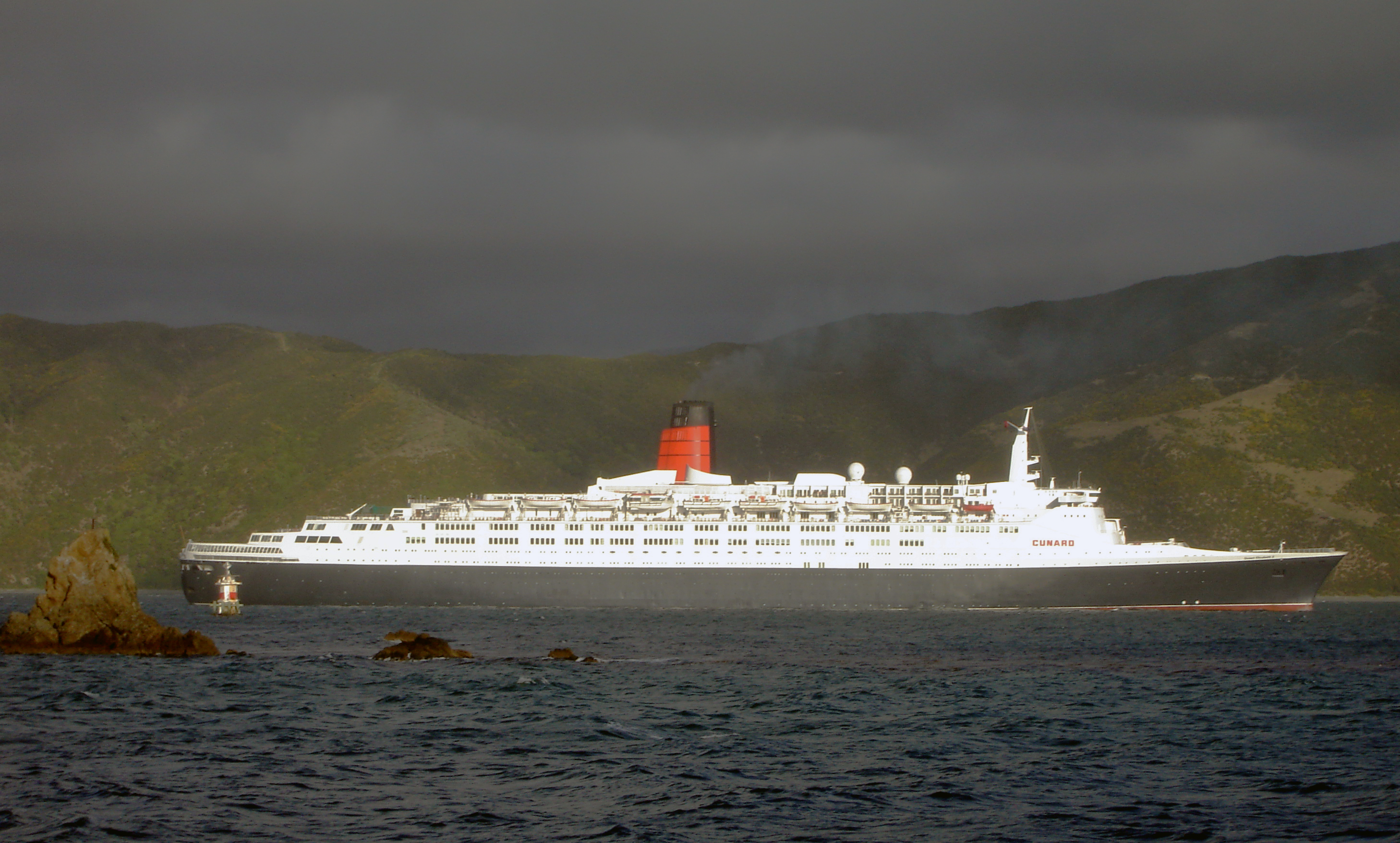
QE2 slips out the entrance in a following breeze, 2006

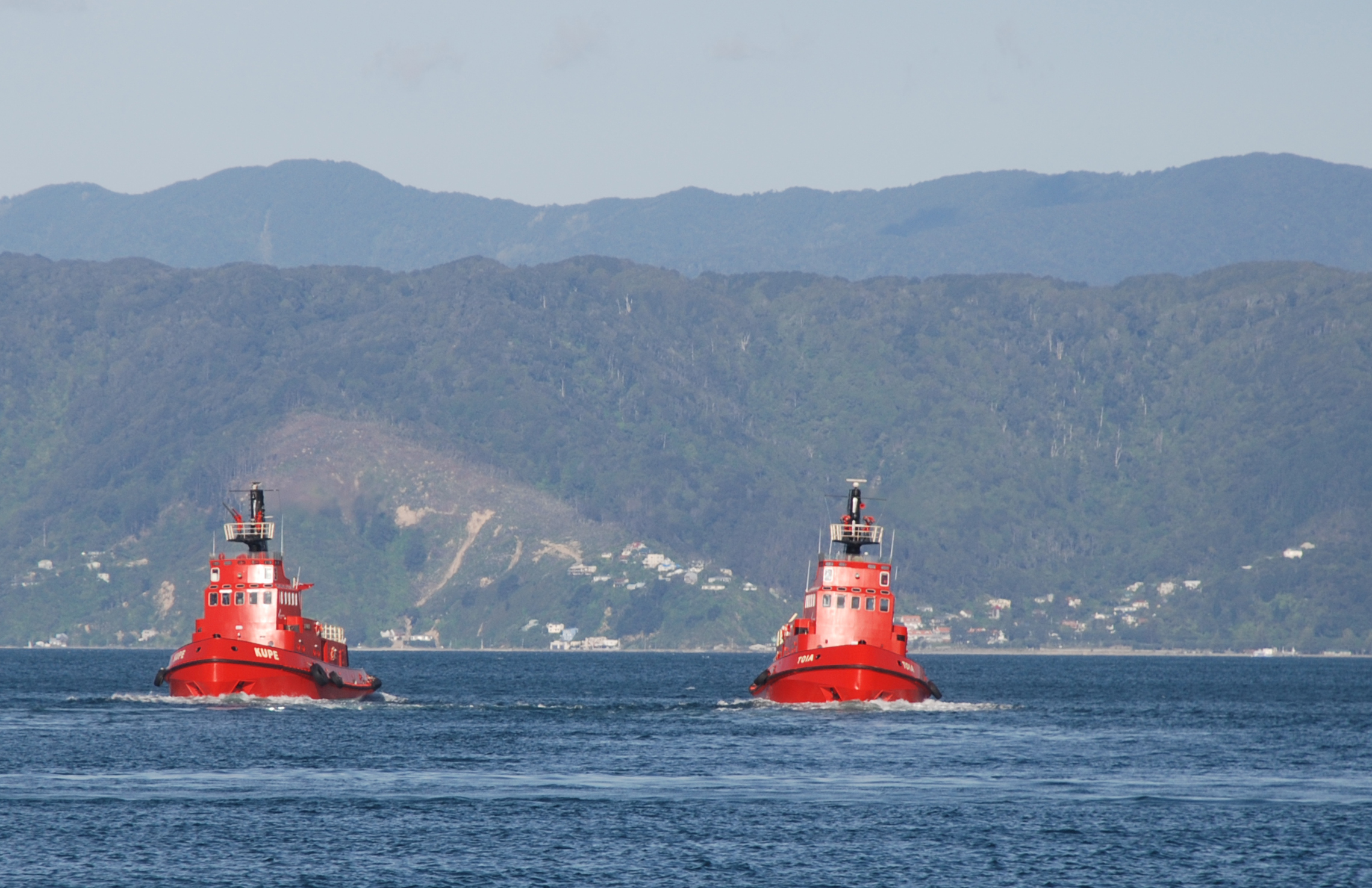
Tugs Kupe and Toia, 2006

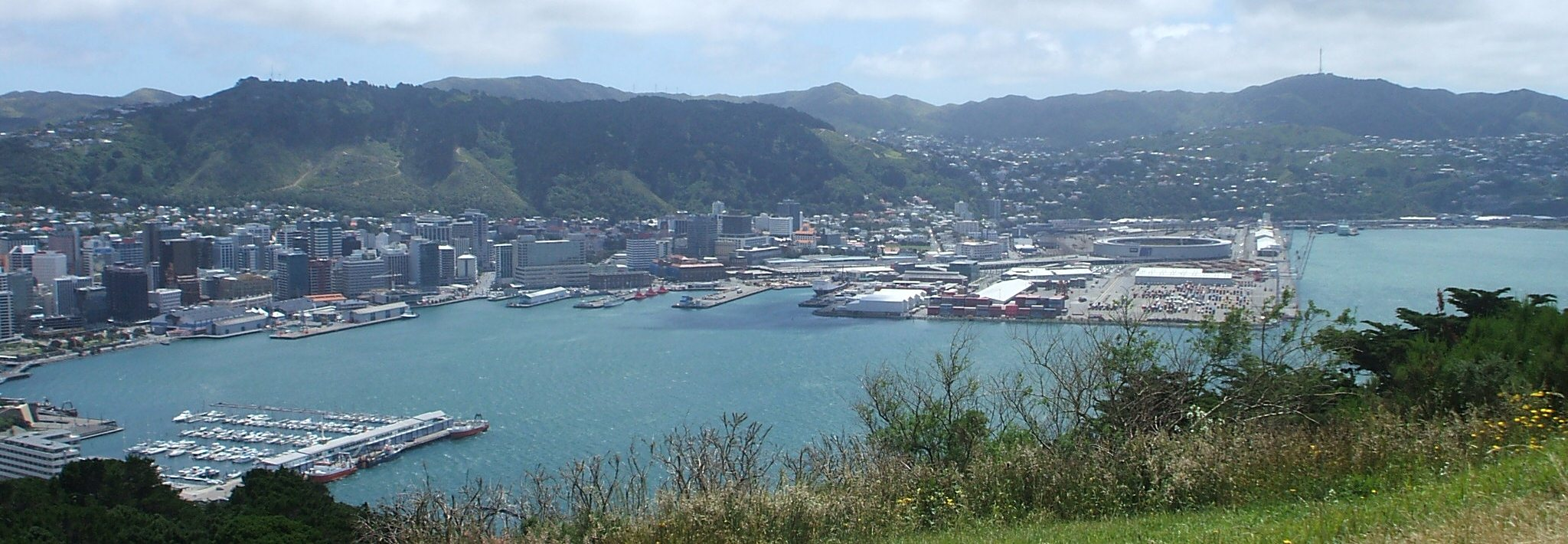
Lambton Harbour, 2007

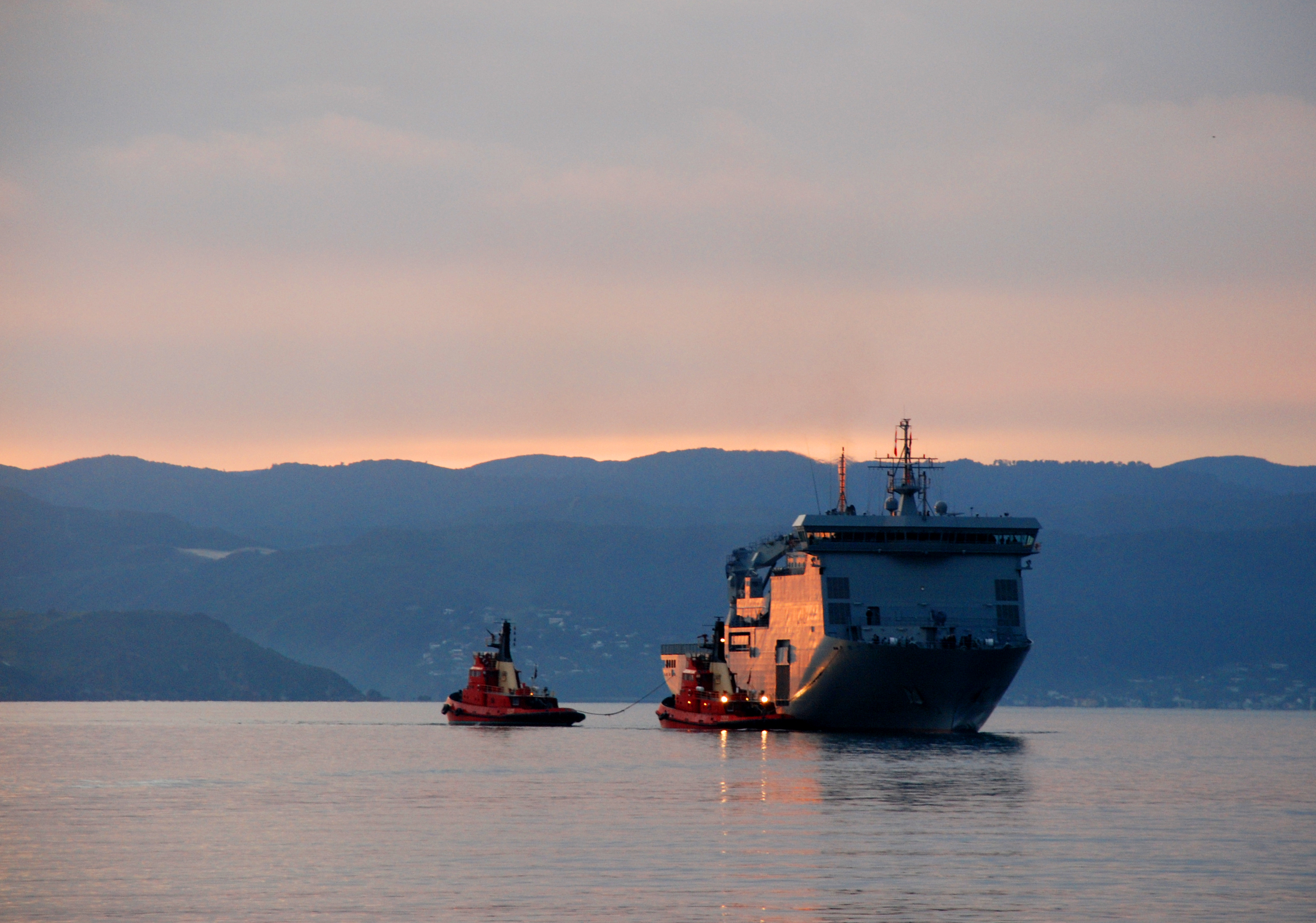
HMNZS Canterbury, 2007

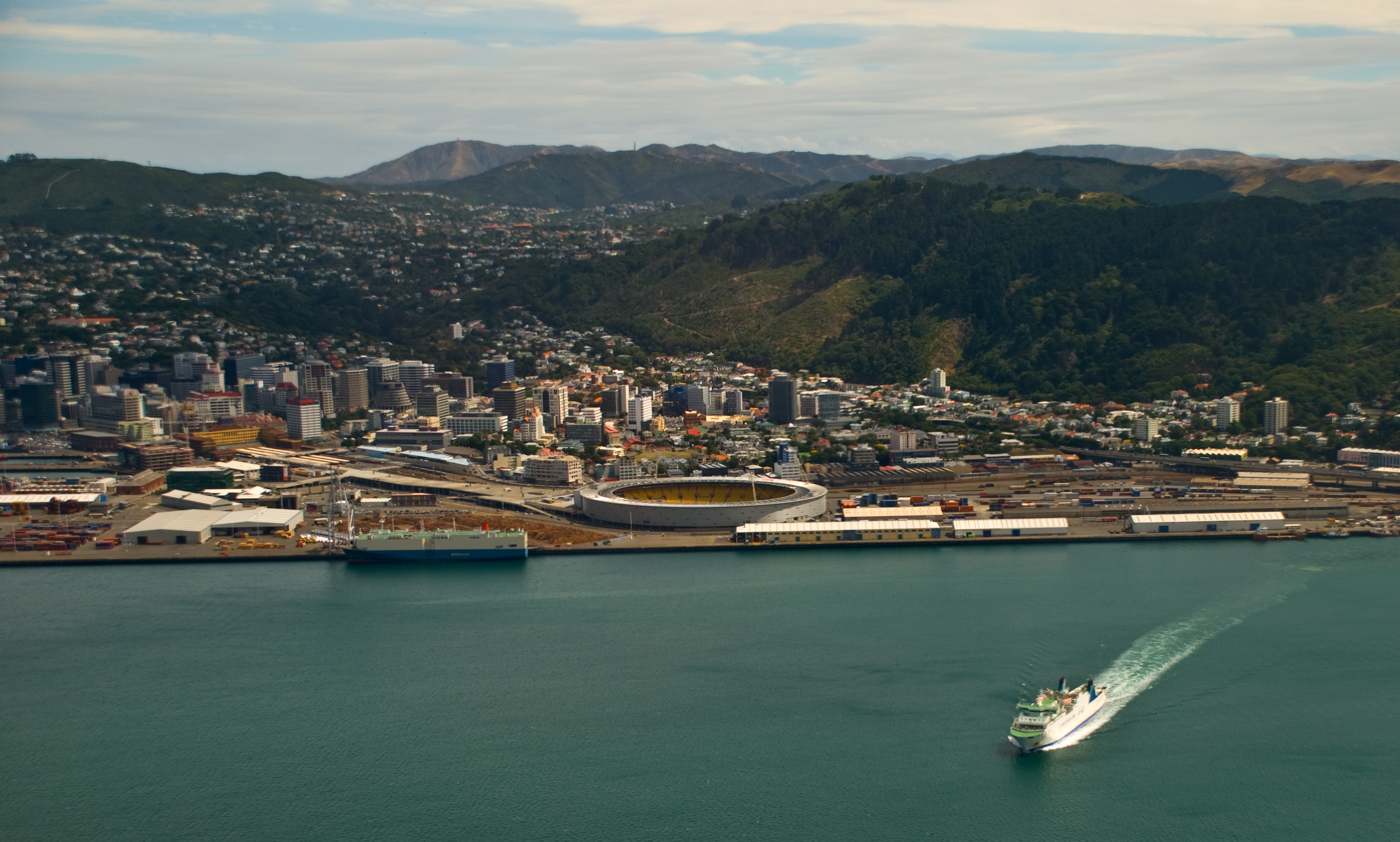
Aotea Quay, 2008

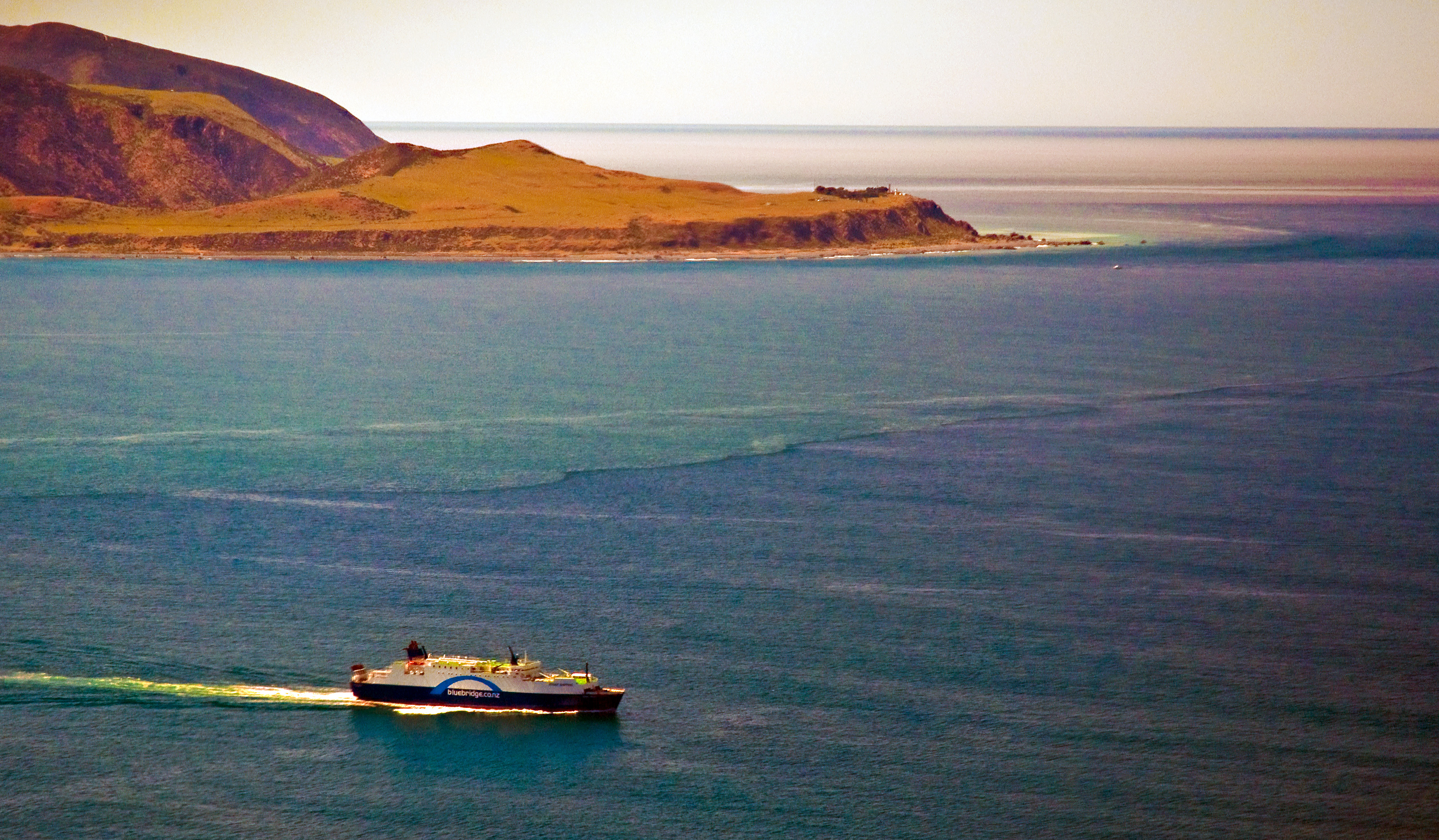
Ferry and Barrett Reef just after low water, 2010

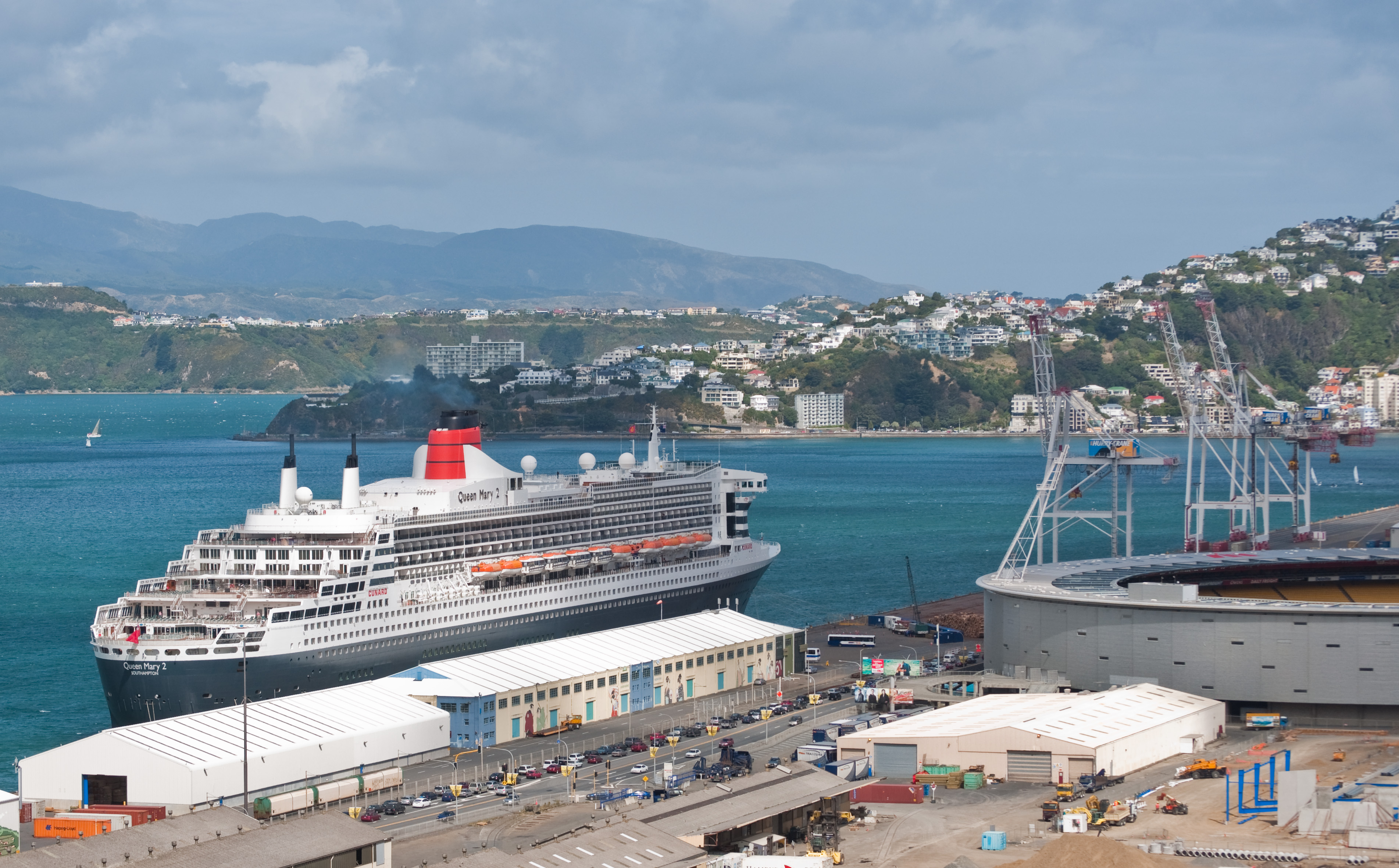
Aotea Quay, Queen Mary 2, 2011

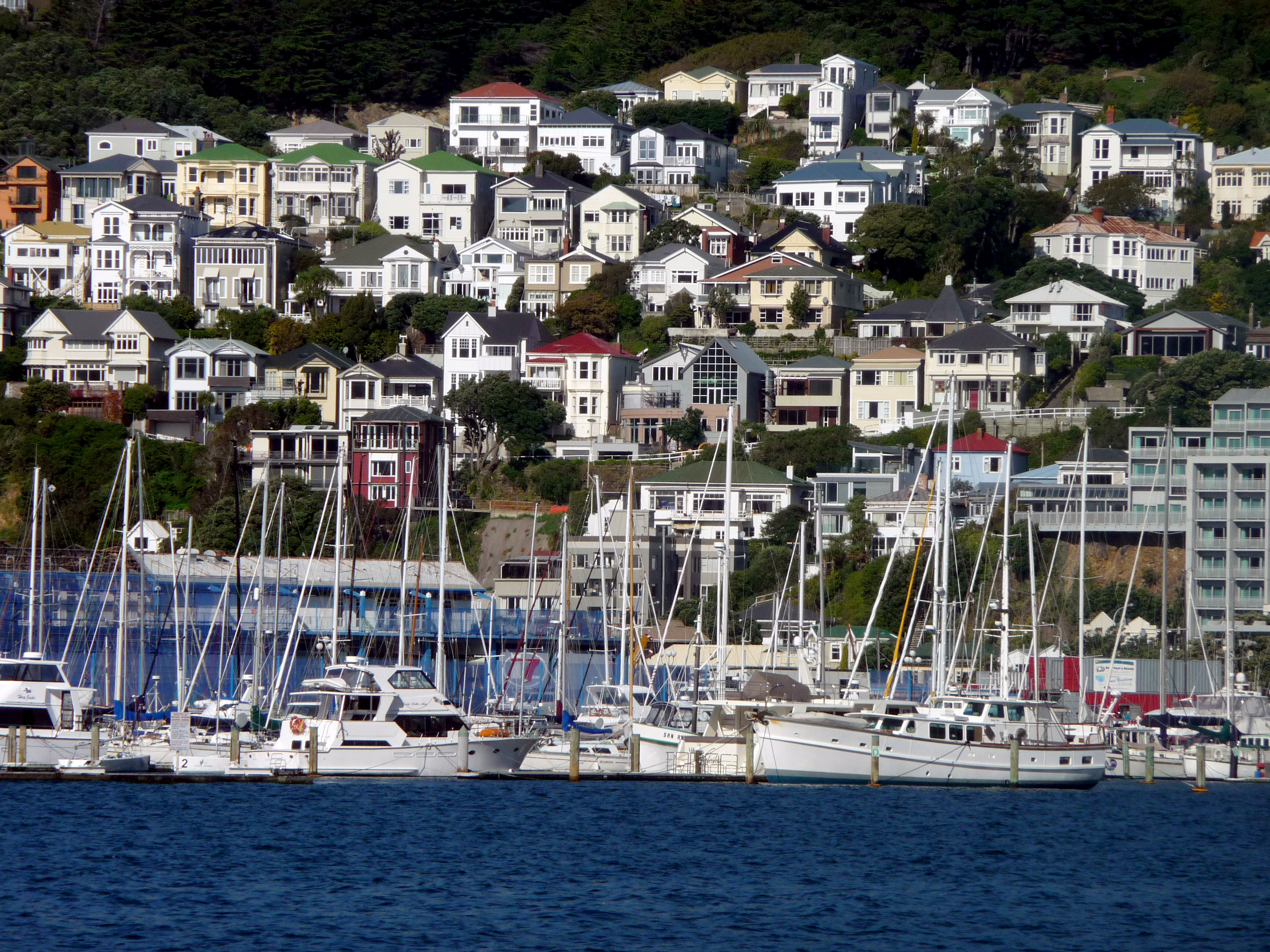
Pleasure craft, 2012

== See also ==
- Reclamation of Wellington Harbour
- Miramar Peninsula
- Evans Bay
- Porirua Harbour
