= Wellington Fault =

Active seismic fault in New Zealand

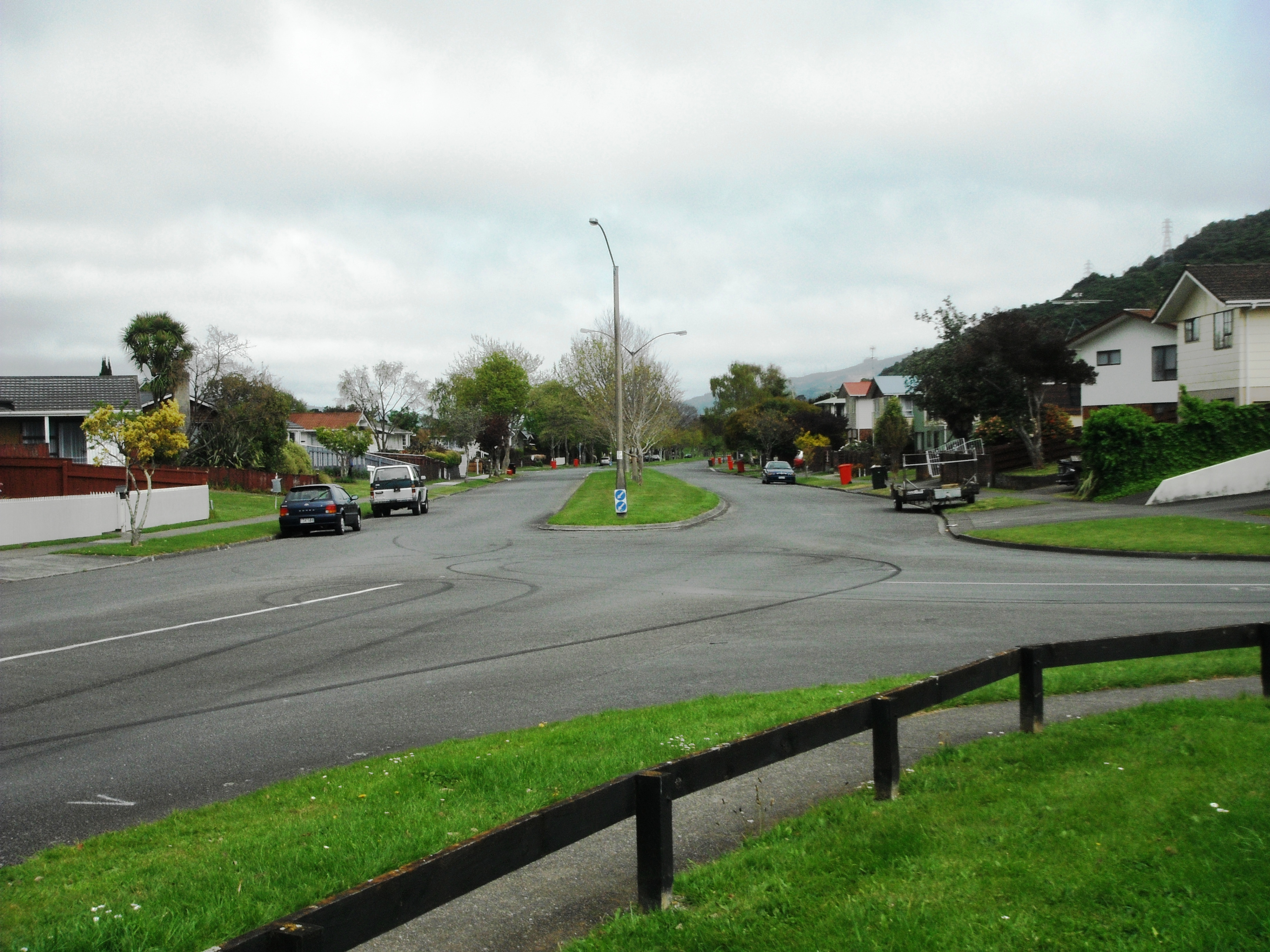
- The Wellington Fault runs under California Drive in Totara Park, Upper Hutt. The road has been built extra wide with a central median to keep houses back from the fault line.
- Map of active Wellington Fault traces (red)
- Etymology: Duke of Wellington
- Country: New Zealand
- Region: Wellington Region
- Cities: Wellington

Characteristics
- Range: Up to 8 Mw
- Segments: multiple
- Length: 170 km (110 mi)
- Displacement: Up to 7.6 mm (0.30 in)/year

Tectonics
- Plate: Australian
- Status: Active
- Type: Dextral fault
- Age: Miocene-Holocene
- New Zealand geology database (includes faults)

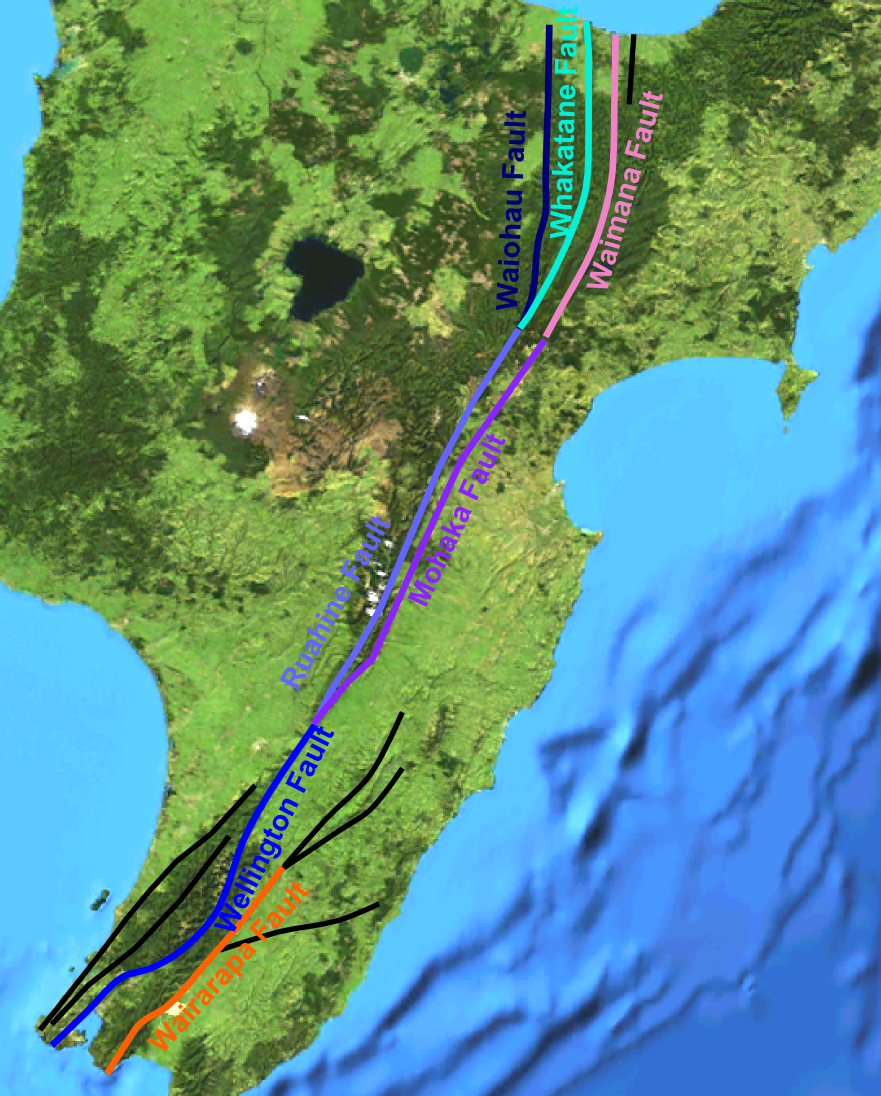
Wellington Fault (blue) in context main strands of the North Island Fault System.

The Wellington Fault is an active seismic fault in the southern part of the North Island of New Zealand. It is a dextral (right-lateral) strike-slip fault with variable amounts of vertical movement causing uplift to the northwest, as expressed by a series of ranges. It forms part of the North Island Fault System, which accommodates the transfer of displacement along the oblique convergent boundary between the Indo-Australian Plate and Pacific Plate.

== Geometry ==
The Wellington Fault consists of three main sections.

=== Wellington-Hutt Valley section ===
This 75 km long curved fault segment is mapped on the floor of Cook Strait before crossing the Wellington peninsula through Long Gully and along the northwestern edge of Wellington Harbour, past Lower Hutt terminating near Kaitoke. This segment has had a lateral slip-rate of 6.0–7.6 mm per year for at least the last 140,000 years, from the progressive offset of dated river terraces. The most recent rupture event along this section is constrained to 150–450 yrs BP (Before Present). This section is interpreted to give rise to characteristic earthquakes involving rupture of the entire fault segment, with a single-event displacement of 3.8–4.6 m. The recurrence interval is 500–770 years. The Kaitoke basin is a small pull-apart basin formed at the 2 km lateral offset between this segment and the Tararua segment, near Kaitoke.

It is possible that the Māori legend of the formation of Whanganui-a-Tara (Wellington Harbour) derives from an oral record of an early quake along this fault.

=== Tararua section ===
The 53 km long arcuate Tararua segment starts just north of Kaitoke along the eastern side of the Tararua Range. It terminates near Putara. It consists of two active fault strands, the southeasterly of which carries most of the displacement, as shown by offset drainage patterns. The strike of this section changes from 041° in the south to 020° in the north. The dextral slip rate for this section is 4.9–7.6 mm/yr, with a single-event displacement of 3.5–5.5 m and a recurrence interval of 500–1120 years.

=== Pahiatua section ===
This 42 km long segment runs from near Putara in the south to near Woodville in the north, where the fault branches into the Ruahine and Mohaka Faults. This segment is relatively linear with a strike of 033°. The dextral slip rate for this section is 4.9–6.2 mm/yr, with a single-event displacement of 4.5±1 m and a recurrence interval of 560–1120 years.

== Seismic hazard ==
Although no historic earthquake has been recorded for this fault, the potential impact of rupture along the Wellington-Hutt Valley section on the Wellington area makes it one of the greatest natural hazards in New Zealand. The Wellington Fault is also capable of producing earthquakes of up to magnitude 8. While a major rupture on the Wellington Fault can be expected anytime in the next 500 years, a significant earthquake on other faults in the Wellington area have a shorter 150 year return time.

== See also ==
- Geology of New Zealand
- Geology of the Wellington Region
- North Island Fault System
- Wairarapa Fault
