= 1843 Wanganui earthquake =

Earthquake in New Zealand

- Location within New Zealand
- UTC time: 1843-07-09
- Local date: 8 July 1843
- Magnitude: M_{w} 7+
- Epicentre: near Whanganui, North Island; 40°00′S 176°03′E
- Areas affected: New Zealand
- Max. intensity: MMI X (Extreme)
- Casualties: 2 deaths

The 1843 Whanganui earthquake occurred on 8 July at 16:45 local time with an estimated magnitude of 7.5 on the M_{w} scale. It had a maximum perceived intensity of IX (Violent) on the Mercalli intensity scale, possibly reaching X (Extreme). The epicentre was estimated to be within a zone extending 50 km northeast from Whanganui towards Taihape, with GNS Science placing it 35 km east of Taihape near the border of Hawke's Bay. This was the first recorded earthquake in New Zealand with a magnitude over 7 and the first with recorded deaths.

== Tectonic setting ==
New Zealand is located along the boundary between the Australian and Pacific plates. The South Island experiences most of the plate displacement along the Alpine Fault, a dextral strike-slip fault with a major reverse component. In the North Island, displacement occurs mainly along the Kermadec subduction zone and the North Island Fault System (NIFS). The Marlborough fault system in the northern end of the South Island transfers displacement between transform and convergent plate boundaries. The 1843 earthquake epicenter is not linked to any known fault.

== Earthquake characteristics ==
The earthquake, which lasted for three minutes near Mokoia, was felt across much of North Island. It was estimated to have a magnitude of 7.5 based on the extent of the area experiencing severe shaking. Ten aftershocks were reported on the same day, with additional shocks occurring until January 1845.

== Damage ==
The Whanganui area experienced severe damage reaching IX–X on the Mercalli intensity scale. Numerous houses were damaged, and a brick church in Putiki was destroyed. Lateral spreading occurred along the terrace margin to the Whanganui River, and a portion of Shakespeare Cliff collapsed into the river. Two fatalities resulted from landslides triggered by the earthquake, as a house was swept away.

== See also ==
- 1848 Marlborough earthquake
- List of earthquakes in New Zealand
- List of historical earthquakes
