= Wairarapa Fault =

Active seismic fault in New Zealand

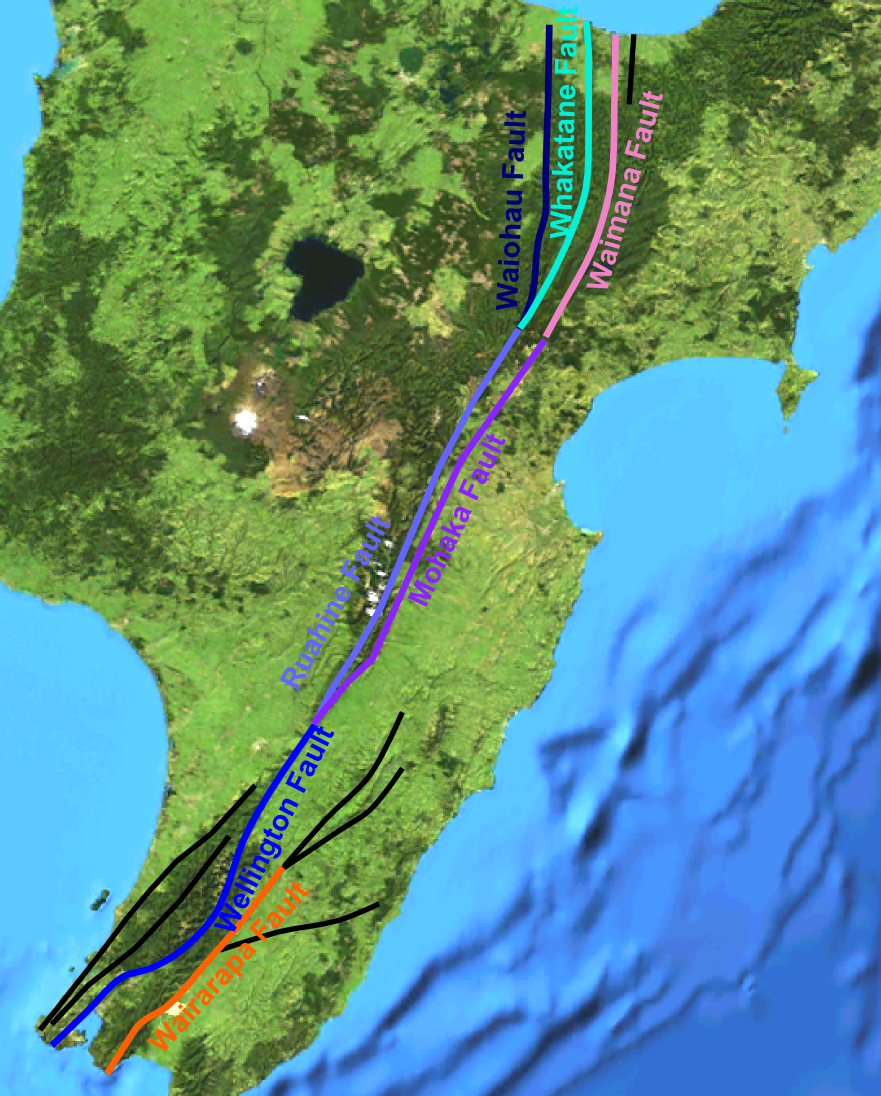
- Wairarapa Fault (orange) in context main strands of North Island Fault System.
- Map of active Wairarapa Fault traces (red)
- Etymology: Wairarapa
- Country: New Zealand
- Region: Wairarapa region

Characteristics
- Range: Rimutaka Range
- Segments: multiple
- Length: over 120 km (75 mi) on shore, likely 160 km (99 mi) in total
- Strike: reverse northeast trending
- Dip: steeply northwest
- Displacement: up to 11.5 mm (0.45 in)/year ± 0.5 mm (0.020 in)/year

Tectonics
- Plate: Australian
- Status: Active
- Earthquakes: 1855 Wairarapa earthquake
- Type: Dextral fault
- Movement: M_{w} 8.1, maximum slip in 1855 was 18.7 m (61 ft) with up to 2.7 m (8 ft 10 in) of vertical displacement
- Age: Miocene-Holocene
- New Zealand geology database (includes faults)

The Wairarapa Fault is an active seismic fault in the southern part of the North Island of New Zealand. It is a dextral (right lateral) strike-slip fault with a component of uplift to the northwest as expressed by the Rimutaka Range. It forms part of the North Island Fault System, which accommodates the transfer of displacement along the oblique convergent boundary between the Indo-Australian plate and Pacific plate.

== Geometry ==
The Wairarapa Fault continues south of Lake Wairarapa as the Wharekauhau thrust, which can be traced on the seabed in the Cook Strait for about 30 km (19 mi) with a possible further continuation on a fault strand lying to the northwest. These faults segments are considered likely to be the active traces of the southern Wairarapa Fault. At its northeastern end the fault terminates near Mauriceville, with the displacement apparently continued on the Pa Valley and Alfredton Faults.

== Seismicity ==
Rupture along the Wairarapa Fault and Wharekauhau thrust was responsible for the 1855 Wairarapa earthquake that initiated at the southern tip of the faults, resulting in 20 m (66 ft) slip maximum, a local peak of 8 m (26 ft) vertical displacement and magnitude of at least M_{w} 8.1. There is also evidence from trenching that the rupture continued onto the Alfredton Fault. The uplifted beach ridges of Turakirae Head provide a proxy record of prehistoric earthquakes. This record has been checked by trenching across parts of the Wairarapa Fault. The trenching recorded five surface rupturing events since about 5,500 years BP, the last of which is the 1855 earthquake and two of which are not recorded by beach ridges. Together the observations give a mean recurrence interval of about 1,200 years. Lidar studies have increased the number of significant whole fault earthquakes to eight and suggest they are all great earthquakes producing a mean lateral slip of 16.5 ± 2.2 m (54.1 ± 7.2 ft).

== Risk ==
It appears that the Wairarapa fault is interacting with at least the Kekerengu, Needles and Awatere faults across Cook Strait to the south, in that at least 3 ruptures there preceded by several years these major earthquakes and presumably loaded the Wairarapa Fault. The 1848 Marlborough earthquake in the southern island preceded the 1855 Wairarapa earthquake by seven years. It is known that the 2016 Kaikōura earthquake loaded the southern part of the fault, but as already mentioned the mean recurrence interval is 1,230 ± 190 years. There is a high probability that the next rupture will be a great earthquake.

== See also ==
- Geology of New Zealand
- Geology of the Wellington Region
- North Island Fault System
- Wellington Fault
