= Haowhenua earthquake =

1460 earthquake in New Zealand

The Haowhenua (Māori for 'land swallower') earthquake occurred around 1460 AD causing uplift to parts of Wellington, New Zealand.

In his 1923 paper "Miramar Island and its History", Elsdon Best recounted Māori stories handed down through generations about early settlement in Wellington and the uplifting of Miramar. The present entrance to Wellington Harbour was called Te Au-a-Tane and the western channel (now the Rongotai isthmus) was called Te-Awa-a-Taia. Between the two channels sat the island of Motu-Kairangi (present day Miramar Peninsula). Best stated:

I obtained from Maori sources a story to the effect that, in the time of Te Ao-haere-tahi, who flourished eighteen generations ago, a violent earthquake-shock so lifted these lands that the Awa-a-Taia channel became dry, and Motu-kairangi a part of the mainland. We have no means of verifying such oral traditions, but it may be correct, and the shock may have been the cause of the raised beaches that form so marked and interesting a feature of the adjacent coast-line. The earthquake referred to, if it occurred in the time of Te Ao-haere-tahi, must have occurred in the fifteenth century.

A study published in 2015 showed evidence of two large earthquakes on the southern Hikurangi Margin, the area where the Pacific tectonic plate is pushed under the Australian plate. The later of these earthquakes happened between 1430 and 1480 AD and could be the Haowhenua earthquake of Māori oral history, which described land uplift in Wellington. The earthquake probably also caused a tsunami: tsunami deposits dating from the 15th century have been found at many locations around the top of the South Island and up to Ōkupe Lagoon on Kapiti Island, and other research links evidence of a huge tsunami around 1450 AD with the Haowhenua earthquake. Shells and a boulder beach found above current sea level around the Miramar Peninsula and around Turakirae Head offer supporting evidence of a large earthquake in the 15th century.
