= 1855 Wairarapa earthquake =

Earthquake in New Zealand

- Location within New Zealand
- Local date: 23 January 1855
- Local time: 21:00
- Magnitude: 8.2 M_{w}
- Depth: 33 km (21 mi)
- Epicentre: 41.20°S 175.20°E
- Areas affected: New Zealand, North Island
- Casualties: 7–9 deaths

The 1855 Wairarapa earthquake occurred on 23 January at about 9.17 p.m., affecting much of the Cook Strait area of New Zealand, including Marlborough in the South Island and Wellington and the Wairarapa in the North Island. In Wellington, close to the epicentre, shaking lasted for at least 50 seconds. The moment magnitude of the earthquake has been estimated as 8.2, the most powerful recorded in New Zealand since systematic European colonisation began in 1840. This earthquake was associated with the largest directly observed movement on a strike-slip fault, maximum 18 metres (59 ft). This was later revised upward to about 20 m (66 ft) slip, with a local peak of 8 m (26 ft) vertical displacement on lidar studies. It has been suggested that the surface rupture formed by this event helped influence Charles Lyell to link earthquakes with rapid movement on faults.

== Tectonic setting ==
New Zealand lies along the boundary between the Australian and Pacific plates. In the South Island most of the relative displacement between these plates is taken up along a single dextral (right lateral) strike-slip fault with a major reverse component, the Alpine Fault. In the North Island the displacement is mainly taken up along the Kermadec subduction zone, although the remaining dextral strike-slip component of the relative plate motion is accommodated by the North Island Fault System (NIFS). A group of dextral strike-slip structures, known as the Marlborough fault system, transfer displacement between the mainly transform and convergent type plate boundaries in a complex zone at the northern end of the South Island. The earthquake occurred on the Wairarapa Fault which is part of the NIFS.

== Earthquake characteristics ==
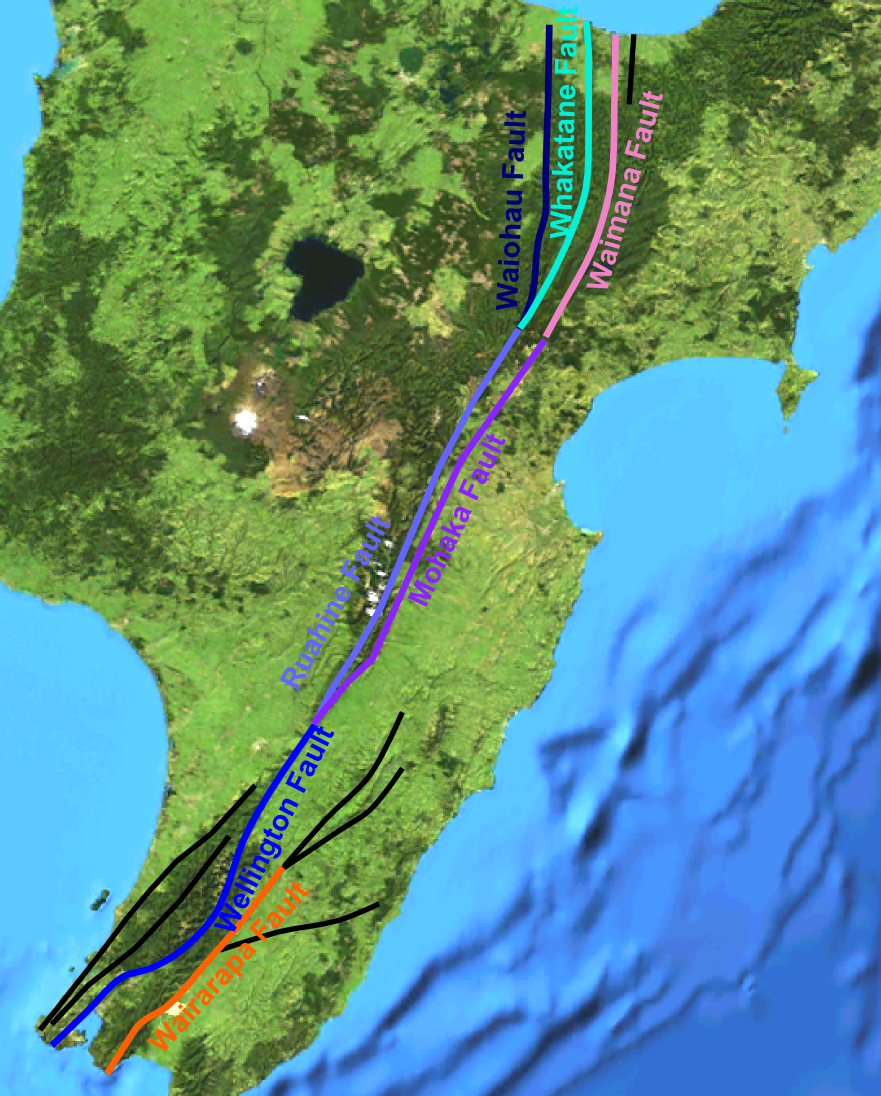
Map of the North Island Fault System showing the Wairarapa Fault

The earthquake was associated with the rupturing of approximately 150 km (93 mi) of the Wairarapa Fault. A horizontal displacement of up to 18 metres (59 ft) was accompanied by uplift and tilting of the Remutaka Range on the northwestern side of the fault with vertical offsets of about 6 metres near the fault reducing to almost nothing on the western coast of the Wellington Peninsula. The estimated magnitude of about 8.2 is unusually large for an earthquake associated with movement on a mainly strike-slip fault, and the coseismic offset would have been the largest known for such an event. It has been suggested that this was caused by the rupture propagating down to where the fault links through to the top of the subducting Pacific plate. That such megathrust coupling with overlying surface faults is possible was subsequently observed with the 2016 Kaikōura earthquake, and a new model for a subset of shallow megathrust earthquakes, including this earthquake, was developed. Other evidence for this hypothesis is geomorphological evidence, particularly the uplifted beach ridges observed at Turakirae Head, that appear to record three previous coseismic uplifts of the Remutaka Range caused by earthquakes similar in magnitude to the 1855 event, with a recurrence interval of about 2200 years.

At least ten large earthquakes were identified along the fault during the Holocene. Three of the most recent, including the 1855 earthquake, produced average slips of 16.5 m (54 ft) ± 2.2 m (7 ft 3 in). The unusually large slip to rupture length ratio meant the earthquake would have been a high stress drop, hence, energetic event. This may be possibly attributed to the geologically young nature of the fault, being about 1 to 3 million years old, making it an immature structure. Faults in their early developmental stage have been observed to generate earthquakes with the most greatest stress drop and strong ground motion.

== Damage ==
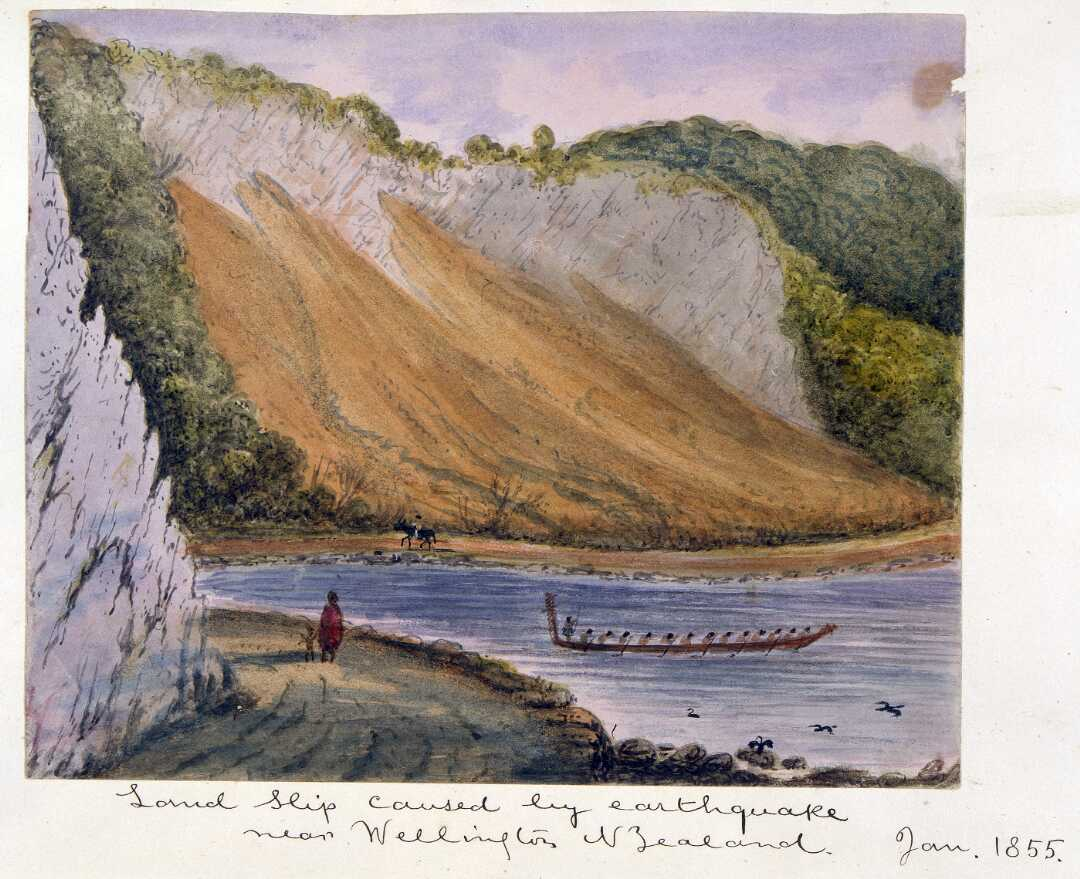
1855 painting of landslip near Newlands by Charles Emilius Gold

Wellington experienced severe shaking but the resulting damage was reduced as the city had been extensively rebuilt following the 1848 Marlborough earthquake using mainly wooden structures; only one recorded fatality (by collapse of a brick chimney) occurred, though several other buildings were damaged. Reports identify at least another four people (possibly as many as eight) as having died in the Wairarapa during the earthquake and a bridge over the Hutt River was wrecked. Numerous landslides were associated with the earthquake, including the harbour-side cliffs near Newlands and numerous events along the slopes of the Remutaka Range. Minor damage was recorded in places as far away as New Plymouth, Lyttelton and Christchurch.

The uplift of the northwestern side of Wellington Harbour rendered many of the jetties in the harbour unusable, although this new area of land provided a new rail and road route to the north. Much of modern Wellington's central business district is formed by reclamations on land raised from the harbour by the event, as shown by the series of "Shoreline 1840" plaques. At Turakirae Head the newest raised beach was formed by an uplift of 6.4 m (21 ft) in the 1855 quake.

Along with other historic earthquakes in the Wellington region, the severe uplift and landslides along the coastline caused by the 1855 Wairarapa earthquake would have likely extirpated local populations of Durvillaea antarctica southern bull kelp. For comparison, a large-scale die off of Durvillaea was observed following the 2016 Kaikōura earthquake. The removal of D. antarctica along the Wellington coastline in 1855 (or earlier) would have created an ecological opportunity, which may have facilitated a northward range expansion for Durvillaea poha from the South Island.

== Tsunami ==
The earthquake generated New Zealand's largest historical locally generated tsunami, with a maximum run-up of 10–11 m (33–36 ft). New Zealand's National Institute of Water and Atmospheric Research created an animated tsunami simulation model based on the 1855 Wairarapa event, which was screened on the television tele-drama "Aftershock".

== See also ==
- 1843 Wanganui earthquake
- 1888 North Canterbury earthquake
- List of earthquakes in New Zealand
- List of historical earthquakes
- List of tsunamis
