= North Island Fault System =

Fault zone of the east coast of New Zealand's North Island

- North Island Shear Belt, NIFS, North Island Dextral Fault Belt,
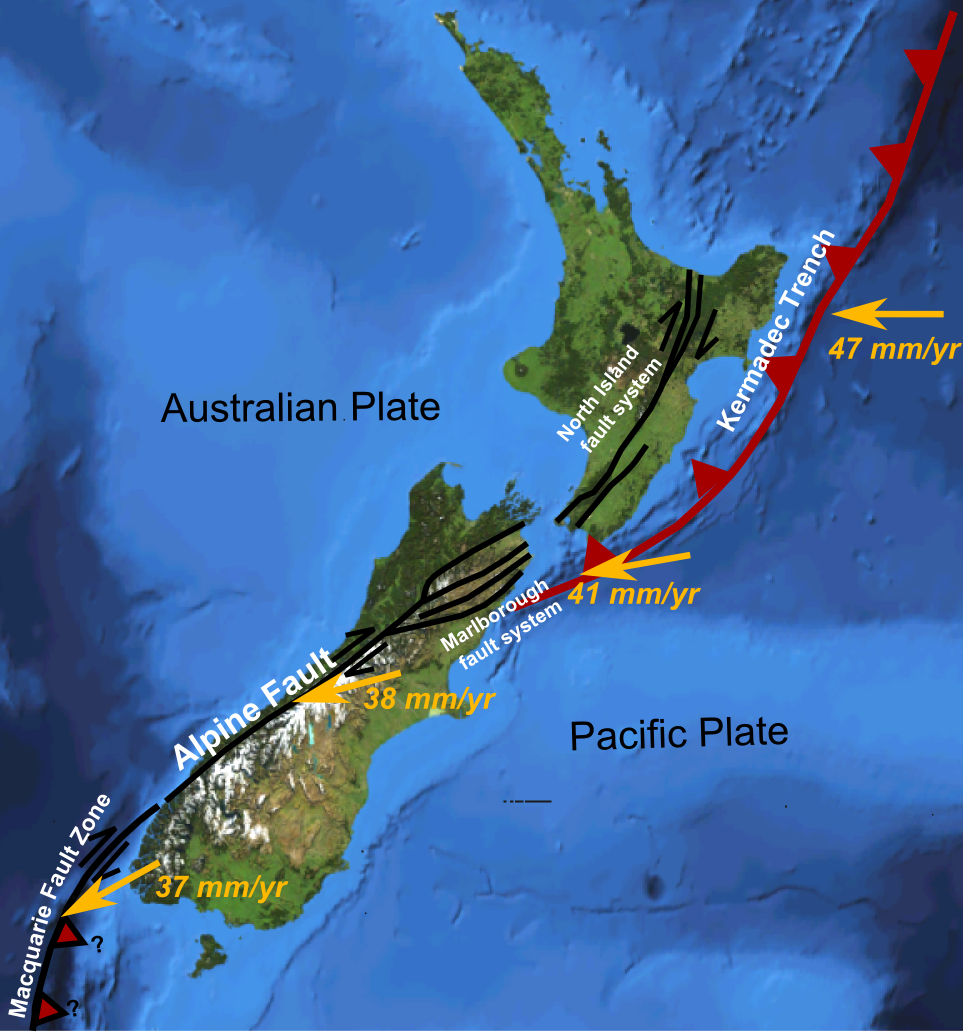
- Major active fault zones of New Zealand for orientation (North Island Fault System is labelled) and to show variation in displacement vector of Pacific Plate relative to the Kermadec Plate and Australian Plate along the boundary. The Kermadec Trench label would better read Hikurangi Trough at this position. The Kermadec Plate is not labelled but lies between the labels of the North Island Fault System and the Kermadec Trench in the picture.

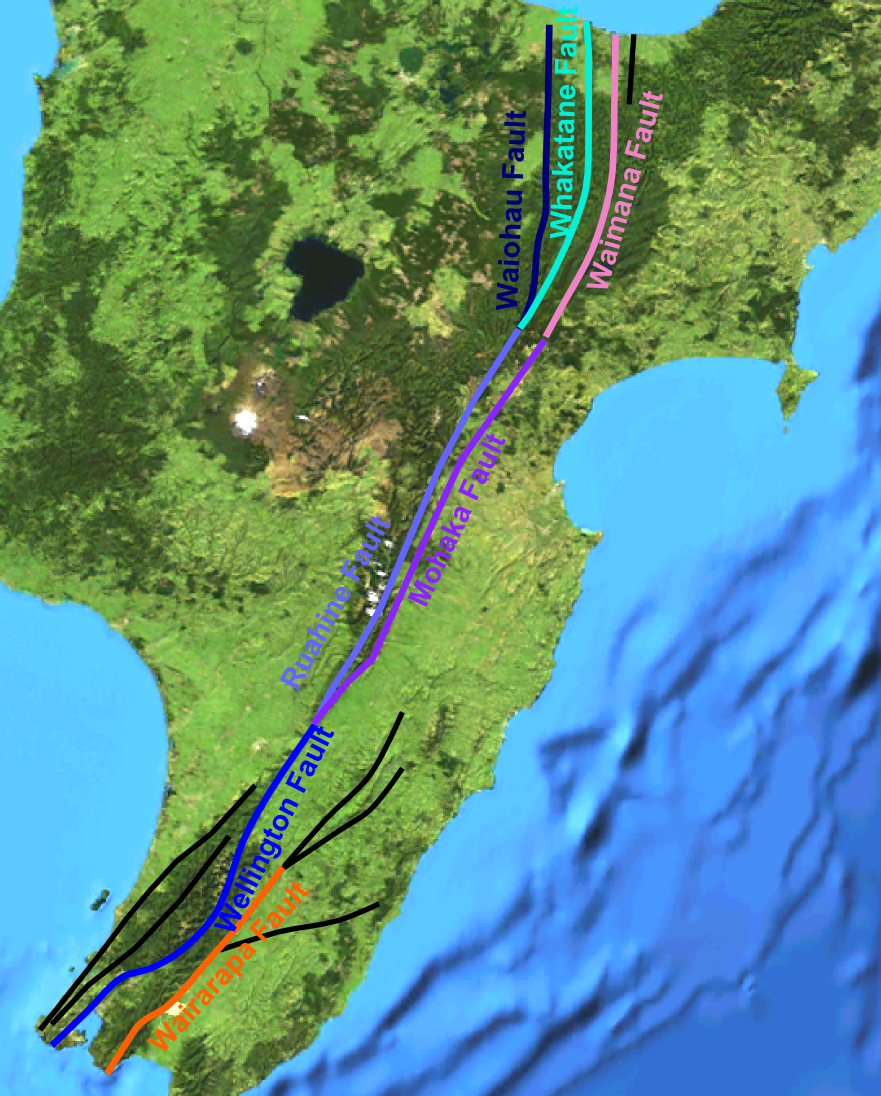
- Main active strands of the North Island Fault System
- Etymology: North Island
- Country: New Zealand
- Region: North Island

Characteristics
- Length: 200 km (120 mi)
- Displacement: 1 cm (0.39 in)/yr

Tectonics
- Plate: Australian
- Status: Active
- Type: strike-slip
- Movement: M_{w} 8.2
- Age: Miocene-Holocene
- New Zealand geology database (includes faults)

The North Island Fault System (NIFS) (also known as North Island Dextral Fault Belt or North Island Shear Belt) is a set of southwest–northeast trending seismically-active faults in the North Island of New Zealand that carry much of the dextral (right lateral) strike-slip component of the oblique convergence of the Pacific Plate with the Australian Plate. However despite at least 3 km (1.9 mi) of uplift of the axial ranges in the middle regions of the fault system during the last 10 million years most of the shortening on this part of the Hikurangi Margin is accommodated by subduction.

The faults include the Wairarapa Fault and Wellington Fault to the southwest, the Ruahine and Mohaka Faults in the central section and the Waimana, Waiotahi, Whakatane and Waiohau Faults to the northeast. Most of the fault system consists of dextral strike-slip faults, although towards its northeastern end the trend swings to more S-N trend and the faults become mainly oblique normal in sense as the zone intersects with the Taupō Rift. This fault zone accommodates up to 1 cm/year (0.39 in/year) of strike-slip displacement.

== Faults ==
The North Island Fault System consists of eight main fault strands and many smaller related faults that are also currently active.

=== Mohaka Fault ===
The more southeasterly branch of the Wellington Fault is known as the Mohaka fault. The fault splays to the north, onto the Waimana Fault, which itself has branches of the Waiotahi and Waioeka Faults. The Waimana Fault is 50 km (31 mi) long with potential for a M_{w} 6.9 shock at its recurrence interval of 2850 years and slip rate of 0.07 cm/year (0.028 in/year). The main segment of the Mohaka Fault eventually passes into the Whakatane Fault which has an off shore extension. The Whakatane Fault has multisegment capacity for a size M_{w} 7 earthquake at a recurrence interval of 3000 years and slip rate of 0.1 cm/year (0.039 in/year). To the east of the Mohaka Fault is the Patoka Fault which commences in the Tūtaekurī River valley within 500 m (1,600 ft) of a Mohaka Fault splay. Where the Potaka Fault intercepts the Esk Forest its most eastern active splay becomes the Rukumoana Fault. The Potaka Fault terminates just south of the peak Tauwhare Papauma on State Highway 5. The Rukumoana Fault has an active northern splay called the Rangiora Fault and both terminate in the region of Hawke's Bay north of Lake Tutira. Where the Rangiora Fault terminates the Waiotahi Fault to its north by about 20 km (12 mi) becomes the most eastern active fault in the system.

There has been a transition from episodic dip-slip-dominated displacement during the late Miocene–Pliocene to oblique-slip and strike-slip-dominated offset more recently. Prior to the late Miocene, before about 11 million years ago, at least 500 m (1,600 ft) of western vertical displacement occurred on the Mohaka Fault, and more recently, in the last 2.3 million years the maximum vertical displacement has been at least a further 500 m (1,600 ft) found about 30 km (19 mi) south of Hawkston. It is noted that at Hawkston itself there has been no vertical displacement although both the southern end and northern end of the fault there has been vertical displacement during this period. The souther displacement of about 350 m (1,150 ft) produced the Wakarara Range. The Mohaka Fault has had about 300 m (980 ft) of strike-slip displacement in the last 2 million years.

=== Ruahine Fault ===
Map showing known active surface faults associated with North Island Fault System. Faults in the Taupō Rift and the Hawkes Bay earthquake zones are not shown. By default faults are rendered in red, but the main strands are coloured as in the main active fault strands map. Thus Wellington Fault (blue), Ruahine Fault (light blue), Mohaka Fault (purple), Wairarapa Fault (orange), Waiohau (dark blue), Whakatane (light green), Waimana (orange), and Waiotahi (pink) to aid contextual interpretation. Clicking on the map enables a version with mouse-over display of individual fault data enabled.

As the Wellington Fault branches near Woodville, the more northwesterly branch is known as the Ruahine Fault. Results from trenching over this fault suggest an earthquake recurrence interval of 400–500 years, with typical offsets in the range 3.0–5.5 m. Similarly to the Mohaka Fault, it appears that the Ruahine Fault has displacement rates of just above 0.5 cm/year (0.20 in/year) and had a transition from episodic dip-slip-dominated displacement during the late Miocene–Pliocene to oblique-slip and strike-slip-dominated offset more recently. The Ruahine Fault commenced its vertical displacement about 10 million years ago in the late Miocene. Most of the Ruahine Fault presently accommodates down to the east vertical displacements but between 4 and 3 million years ago 200 m (660 ft) up to the east vertical displacement has been found on a portion of the fault. In the last 3.6 million years geological studies have shown that less than 10 km (6.2 mi) of dextral offset has occurred on the Ruahine Fault. At its northern end this fault becomes the Waiohau Fault which has several geologically active splays. There is a western splay of the Ruahine Fault before this to the Kaweka Fault around the Mohaka River valley. The Kaweka Fault remains the most western fault until it becomes in turn the Wheao Fault in the Waipunga River valley. The Te Whaiti Fault is a splay towards the NNE of the Wheao Fault that rejoins it near Murupara and for a brief while the Te Whaiti Fault is the most western active fault of the system before it merges with a splay of the Waiohau Fault which terminates at the head of the Rangitaiki River valley.

=== Waimana Fault ===
The Waimana Fault is to the east of the Whakatane Fault both of which join the Mohaka Fault in the south of the system To its north it has an off shore portion that terminates against the White Island Fault which is the eastern margin of the Taupō Rift.

=== Waiohau Fault ===
The Waiohau Fault extends from the end of the Ruahine Fault north towards the Bay of Plenty for 61 km (38 mi). The slip rate is 0.14 cm/year (0.055 in/year) with estimated movement of a multisegment fault rupture of M_{w} 7.1 with an average recurrence of 3000 years. It lies roughly parallel with, and to the west of, the Whakatane, Waimana, and Waiotahi Faults, and to the east of the Taupō Rift. At its southern end it is a dextral strike-slip fault, becoming a normal dip-slip fault for the northern part of its length. The valley of the Rangitaiki River approximately follows the line of the fault. It terminates against the eastern margin of the Taupō Rift in the on shore portion of the Whakatāne Graben. The fault is believed to be responsible for an earthquake in 1866 which was centred near Te Mahoe, east of Kawerau.

=== Waiotahi Fault ===
The Waiotahi Fault commences near the end of the Mangahopai Road in Hawkes Bay and extends as the most eastern active fault in the system through the western aspects of Lake Waikaremoana. It then has an eastern splay, the Koranga Fault just north of the peak Tataemakora while itself continuing all the way via the coast west of Ōpōtiki to terminate off shore where it intercepts the White Island Fault of the Taupō Rift. The Karanga Fault terminates in the mountains 20 km (12 mi) south of Opotiki.

=== Wairarapa Fault ===
The Wairarapa Fault extends from near the coast just southwest of Lake Wairarapa, running along the lake's northwestern edge. The M_{w} 8.2 1855 Wairarapa earthquake was caused by movement along this fault. The recurrence interval for large earthquakes on this fault is less than 2,000 years. There are associated faults such as the Wharekauhau Thrust to the south and the Mangaoranga Fault to the north that might partake in a propagating rupture.

=== Wellington Fault ===
The Wellington Fault is a dextral strike-slip fault that runs from the Cook Strait on the southern coast of North Island up to near Woodville, where the fault branches into the Mohaka and Ruahine Faults. No historical earthquakes have been recorded along this fault although a significant event is estimated to have occurred within the last 1,000 years. The recurrence interval for large earthquakes on this fault is estimated to be less than 2,000 years. Three main segments have been identified, the Wellington-Hutt section, the Tararua section and the Pahiatua section.

=== Whakatane Fault ===
The Whakatane Fault is where the North Island Fault System intersects the Taupō Rift and so displacement across the Whakatane Fault is expected to be oblique, with both normal dip-slip (1.5 ± 0.5 mm/year) and right-lateral strike-slip (1.1 ± 0.5 mm/year) components of motion. The known three surface-rupturing prehistoric earthquakes over the last 10,000 years were associated with net slip at the ground surface of about 3 m (9.8 ft).

== Tectonics ==
In this south eastern portion of the North Island, the continental Australian Plate is obliquely converging at over 4 cm/year (1.6 in/year) with the oceanic Pacific Plate at the Hikurangi Margin, and the North Island Fault System carries most of the dextral (right lateral) strike-slip component of this convergence. The amount assigned to the strike slip component varies down the fault system as for example offshore of Gisborne, which is near the north east of the system, approximately 6 cm/year (2.4 in/year) of plate subduction is occurring while off the Wairarapa shore this decreases to perhaps 2 cm/year (0.79 in/year). The Hikurangi Plateau, a remnant of a large igneous province is being subducted under the North Island at this margin currently, and these subducted parts are reaching 37–140 km (23–87 mi) into the mantle beneath the North Island and northern South Island. So in the northern two thirds of the fault system, as well as the shallow earthquakes of the system, there are also deeper earthquakes associated with the subduction slab. Modelling since the well characterised but atypically large displacements of the 2016 Kaikōura earthquake suggests the possibility that the large displacements seen in the last great earthquake in the system, that of 1855, compared to classic earthquake fault modelling, may have been related to a shallow megathrust earthquake. In the southern portion of the system around Wellington the subduction slab deep earthquakes of the Wadati–Benioff zone are off shore to the west.

The Kermadec microplate, which is presently in terms of movement, an independent part of the Australian Plate, probably extends to Cook Strait, with the Kermadec Plate's unclear south western boundary being the North Island Fault System. The western boundary of this plate is currently associated with to its north the spreading center of the back arc Lau Basin which continues to the south as the Havre Trough and this becomes the Taupō Rift which is the western boundary of the northern North Island Fault System and hosts the active Taupō Volcanic Zone.

The two islands of New Zealand are separated by Cook Strait but the fault system effectively merges to the south with the Marlborough Fault System which is a large dextral strike-slip fault zone that ultimately transfers the displacement to the mainly transform plate boundary of the Alpine Fault that extends down the western South Island. To the north the North Island Fault System extends offshore on the Zealandia continental shelf and merges with the activity associated with the Kermadec-Tonga subduction zone.
