= Turakirae Head =

Headland in New Zealand

Turakirae Head Māori: Turakirae
- Headland
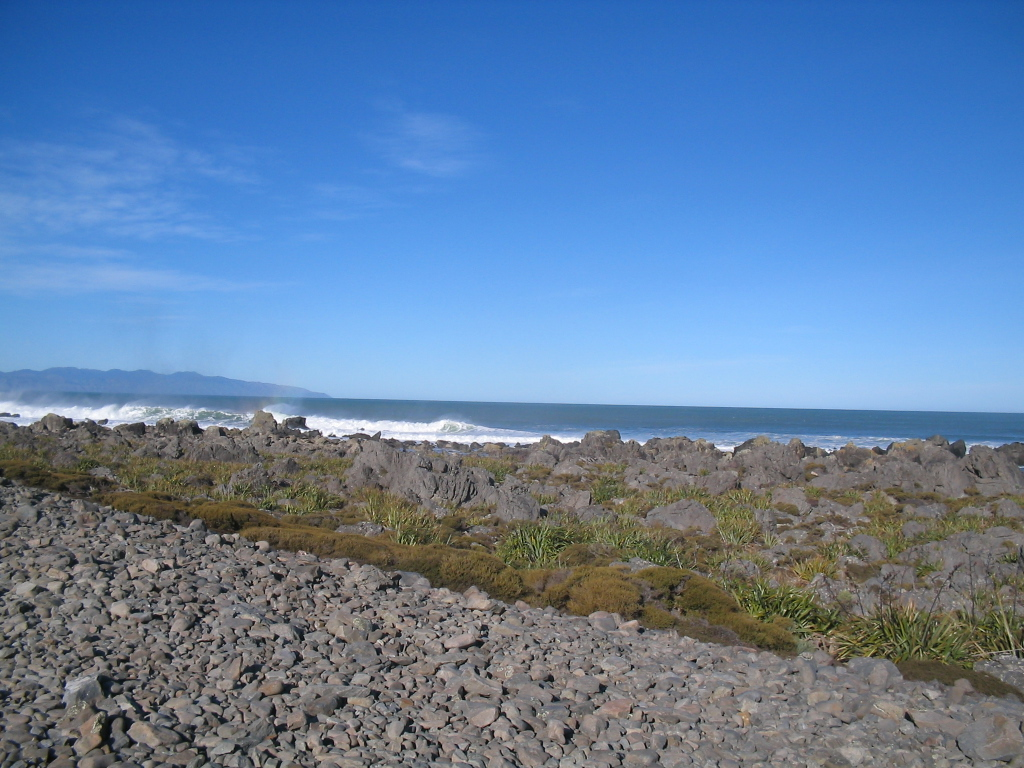
- Raised beach, Turakirae Head

- Location within New Zealand
- Coordinates: 41.4339°S 174.9181°E
- Water bodies: Palliser Bay, Cook Strait

Turakirae Head is a promontory and scientific reserve on the southern coast of New Zealand's North Island. It is located at the western end of Palliser Bay, 20 kilometres southeast of Wellington, at the southern end of the Remutaka Range. The headland is notable for a series of marine terraces and beach ridges that record uplift from past earthquakes. Turakirae Head is also home to a seal colony and southern bull kelp.

Turakirae also marks the southernmost coastal boundary point for the Ngāti Kahungunu tribe which extends as far north as Paritu which is just south of Gisborne.

== Geology ==
Four Holocene marine terraces are visible at Turakirae Head, providing a record of earthquake-caused uplifting of the land over the last 7000 years. The lowest ridge was raised by the 1855 Wairarapa earthquake, which caused a maximum uplift of 6.4 m. The next ridge, with a maximum uplift of 9.1 m, was previously thought to have formed as a result of the Haowhenua earthquake around 1460 AD, but is now believed to have formed around 110–430 BC. The third ridge is estimated to have been uplifted by up to 6.8 m after an earthquake between 2164–3468 BC, and the highest and oldest ridge, with a maximum uplift of 7.3 m, occurred after a seismic event in 4660–4970 BC. After the uplift caused by each earthquake, a new terrace and beach ridge formed below the previous one at sea level. All four storm-beach ridges are tilted relative to the sea level which has changed little in 7000 years, with a greater tilt to westward.

== Scientific reserve ==
During the 1960s, thousands of tonnes of boulders were removed from Turakirae Head to be used in construction of the Wellington Urban Motorway. In 1970 the government bought 240 acres of land at Turakirae Head from the Riddiford Estate, in order to protect and preserve the geologic record shown by the raised beaches along the shoreline which were in danger of being destroyed by further possible removal of rock for public works. A fur seal colony became established at Turakirae Head in 1950, and up to 500 seals, mostly juvenile males, overwinter at the colony each year. The reserve is also home to skinks and geckos, and birds such as the banded dotterel, Caspian tern and variable oystercatcher. Fire and grazing by sheep, cattle and rabbits have affected vegetation in the area. In 1998, a new population of shrubby tororaro – classified as a nationally threatened plant – was established at Turakirae Head to bolster an existing population of the shrub at the reserve.

== Ship scuttling area ==
Between 1905 and 1952, 29 ships were scuttled in the waters off Turakirae Head. The scuttling ground was an area approximately five kilometres south-east of the headland, where the water is about 700 metres deep. Although the ships were usually stripped of their fittings before disposal, the deep water is likely to have preserved the hulls. The site is archaeologically significant because the vessels sunk there include a range of ships dating from the 1830s to the early twentieth century, built of wood or iron and powered by sail or steam and thus representing changes in technology. After 1952, ships were scuttled in deeper water further out in Cook Strait, south-west of Cape Palliser.

== Access ==
Access to Turakirae Head is via the Coast Road from Wainuiomata, which ends 3 km from the reserve, and then by foot across private land. There is also a track which runs from the Corner Creek campsite in Wairarapa around the coast to the end of the Coast Road.
