= Christchurch earthquake (disambiguation) =

Christchurch earthquake may refer to a number of earthquakes that affected Christchurch, New Zealand.

== Christchurch earthquakes ==
- 5 June 1869 Christchurch earthquake
- 4 September 2010 Canterbury earthquake
- December 2010 Christchurch earthquake on 26 December 2010
- 2011 Christchurch earthquake on 22 February 2011
- June 2011 Christchurch earthquake on 13 June 2011
- December 2011 Christchurch earthquakes on 23 December 2011
- 2016 Christchurch earthquake on 14 February 2016

== Earthquakes elsewhere causing damage in Christchurch ==
- 1855 Wairarapa earthquake on 23 January 1855
- 1888 North Canterbury earthquake on 1 September 1888
- 1901 Cheviot earthquake on 16 November 1901
- 2016 Kaikōura earthquake on 14 November 2016

== See also ==
- List of earthquakes in New Zealand
- Canterbury earthquake (disambiguation)
