= 1914 East Cape earthquakes =

Earthquakes off North Island, New Zealand in 1914

- Location within New Zealand
- UTC time: 1914-10-06 19:16:00
- 1914-10-28 00:16:00
- ISC event
- 914017
- USGS-ANSS: ComCat
- ComCat
- Local date: 7 October 1914; 28 October 1914
- Local time: 6:46 a.m. NZT
- 11:46 a.m. NZT
- Magnitude: 6.6 M_{w}
- 6.4 M_{w}
- Depth: 12 km (7 mi)
- Epicentre: 37.80°S 178.20°E
- Areas affected: New Zealand
- Max. intensity: MMI IX (Violent)
- Aftershocks: yes
- Casualties: 1 death

In 1914, two earthquakes shook the upper North Island of New Zealand, on Wednesday 7 October and Wednesday 28 October. They were large and shallow, with their epicentres close together northwest of Ruatoria in the Gisborne District. The earthquakes were felt strongly throughout the East Cape area, most noticeably in areas east of the epicentre such as Waipiro Bay, with a large amount of damage occurring in Tokomaru Bay in particular. One person was killed by a landslide near Cape Runaway.

== Tectonic setting ==
The eastern part of North Island lies on the Hikurangi Margin, where the Pacific plate is subducting obliquely beneath the Australian plate. The dextral (right lateral) component of the convergence is accommodated in the overlying plate by a series of dextral strike-slip faults, known as the North Island Fault System.

== Earthquakes ==
The first earthquake occurred at a shallow depth of 12 km (7 mi) at 6:46 a.m. on 7 October, 10 km (6 mi) northwest of the town of Ruatoria, with a moment magnitude of 6.6 and a surface-wave magnitude of 6.7. The shaking is estimated to have lasted for approximately one minute. The severity of the damage caused suggests a maximum Modified Mercalli intensity of IX.

The second earthquake occurred in a similar location, also at a depth of 12 km (7 mi) at 11:46 a.m. on 28 October. Its moment magnitude and surface-wave magnitude were both 6.4. The maximum Mercalli intensity of this earthquake is estimated to be VIII. This second earthquake was an aftershock of the first earthquake, and also had shaking which lasted for approximately one minute.

=== Other events ===
Roughly one month before the first earthquake, on Thursday 10 September, a section of the crater wall of the nearby Whakaari / White Island volcano collapsed, resulting in a lahar that killed either 10 or 11 sulphur miners on the island. The volcano erupted soon after, which was blamed on the lahar having blocked the main vent. Eruptive activity was still occurring at the island at the time of the first earthquake, however it is believed the two events are not related.

Roughly one month after the second earthquake, on Sunday 22 November at 7:44 p.m. local time, another strong earthquake occurred. The earthquake epicentre was located in the Bay of Plenty north of Mōtītī Island, at a depth of 300 km (186 mi), and its moment magnitude was 7.3. Despite being located in the Bay of Plenty, it was felt the strongest in the city of Gisborne, at a maximum intensity of VIII. The earthquake was described as "the severest on record" for the city, with many chimneys and windows breaking. The reason the earthquake was felt the strongest in Gisborne is because the energy from deep earthquakes in the North Island are more easily transmitted through the solid subducting Pacific plate, resulting in them being felt more strongly along the eastern coastline near the plate boundary. Despite having the greatest impact in the same area as the previous earthquakes, its epicentre was far away from the epicentres of the other two, and therefore this event is believed to be unrelated.

== Impact ==
There is an unusually high number of first-hand accounts of these earthquakes. This is largely because seismologist George Hogben was the Secretary for Education at the time, and he instructed all teachers at the schools in the area to create reports on the events.

Numerous fissures opened up in the ground, particularly on and near dry riverbeds, and in some places such as the Wharekahika River "earthquake fountains" occurred. Many landslides occurred during both quakes, especially along the Whangaparāoa River. One of these landslides near Cape Runaway killed a farmer who was out mustering at the time of the first earthquake.

The largest amount of damage occurred in the town of Tokomaru Bay, where there was much damage to both houses and commercial buildings, and almost every chimney in the town was destroyed. The early hour of the morning at which the first earthquake occurred likely resulted in less casualties than there could have been had it occurred later in the day. The townships of Waipiro Bay and Tolaga Bay also experienced heavy shaking, but received less damage, with many chimneys surviving the earthquake.

After the first earthquake, residents rebuilt their chimneys. However, the chimneys were largely destroyed once again during the second earthquake.

In the city of Gisborne, the town clock was stopped by both earthquakes, but no notable damage occurred. Outside of the East Cape area, the earthquakes were felt as far as Auckland and Wellington.

== See also ==
- List of earthquakes in New Zealand
- List of earthquakes in 1914
- 1947 Gisborne earthquakes and tsunami
- 2007 Gisborne earthquake
