= 1922 Motunau earthquake =

Earthquake in New Zealand

- Location within New Zealand
- UTC time: 1922-12-24 03:30
- Local date: 25 December 1922
- Local time: 15:30
- Duration: 1 minute (approximately)
- Magnitude: 6.4–6.7
- Depth: <25 km
- Epicentre: 43°S 173°E
- Areas affected: South Island, New Zealand
- Max. intensity: MMI IX (Violent)

The 1922 Motunau earthquake occurred in New Zealand at approximately 3:30 pm on 25 December 1922, with an epicentre located in the area of Motunau and Greta Valley. It had an estimated magnitude of 6.4 and occurred at crustal depth within 25 km, and an intensity at the epicentre of 9 (devastating tremor) on the Rossi-Forel scale. The event is remembered as the "Christmas Day Earthquake" for disrupting Christmas celebrations in the South Island.

Reports described the event as "violent" with "unabated force", causing people to flee their homes in Christchurch and causing minor damage to the Christ Church Cathedral and buildings across the city. It was felt throughout the South Island and caused extensive damage throughout North Canterbury, particularly in Greta Valley and surrounding towns such as Cheviot, which suffered significant damage. A subsequent landslide disrupted telecommunications, and liquefaction was observed on the coast in the Waikuku Beach area.

== Earthquake ==
At approximately 3:30 pm on 25 December 1922, the earthquake struck in the area between Motunau and Greta Valley with a magnitude of around 6.4 (or up to 6.7 in some estimates) and a crustal depth of less than 25 km (15 mi). At the epicentre, the shaking intensity was rated a 9 (devastating tremor) on the Rossi-Forel scale; a 1991 re-evaluation estimated the MM intensity was 9. A review in 1980 estimated the MM intensity in Christchurch was 7 (very strong) and 8 (severe) inland towards the Canterbury Plains.

An anecdotal report from Rangiora described an "alarming" rumbling before the earthquake movement was felt, which came as a "slow wave from North to South" and built in intensity, becoming a "heavy shake" and then slowly subsiding, in an event that lasted over a period of about one minute.

Subsequent aftershocks were reported during the days after the event. On Boxing Day, further aftershocks and activity were recorded in Hanmer Springs, including discolouration and agitation of the thermal mineral waters.

== Impact and damage ==
A landslide occurred near Greta Valley, which damaged telegraph wires and disrupted communications. The railway was also badly damaged in the area. In nearby Cheviot, most buildings lost their chimneys and were damaged, some significantly, drawing comparisons to the 1901 Cheviot earthquake. Communications with the town were initially delayed due to damaged telegraph wires. Evidence also suggests liquefaction occurred at the beaches in Waikuku and Leithfield; "cold water geysers" were observed erupting from the sands at Waikuku Beach, causing at least one vehicle to partially sink into the ground.

Widespread damage was reported in many towns including Culverden, Hawarden and Waikari. The Waikari Hospital suffered serious damage to the main building rendering it unusable until repairs could take place, but nobody was injured. Most buildings lost their chimneys in Hawarden, and most stores were severely damaged.

In Christchurch, the earthquake caused the most significant impact since the 1869 Christchurch earthquake, with many buildings suffering minor damage. The cross atop the Christ Church Cathedral collapsed, landing on the ground and causing damage to roof tiles as it fell, however no service was taking place in the building when it occurred. It was reported that the earthquake disrupted Christmas celebrations and caused people to flee their homes into their gardens, damaging private residences due to falling furniture and collapsed chimneys. The suburb of Sydenham reportedly suffered the most damage to residential properties. In the city, structural damage was described as minor, mostly due to stonework falling from the facades of various buildings, with pediments collapsing from some structures including The Press building. In Lyttleton, the water by the wharf was said to have moved severely and rocked boats.

A cricket game at Lancaster Park between Marylebone Cricket Club and Canterbury was interrupted for several minutes by the earthquake before resuming. MCC captain Archie MacLaren was asked if he had ever experienced a game stopped by an earthquake, to which he replied "no, never before—and I don't want another."

== See also ==
- 1888 North Canterbury earthquake
- 1901 Cheviot earthquake
- 1929 Arthur's Pass earthquake
- List of earthquakes in New Zealand
- List of historical earthquakes
