= James Mckenzie (outlaw) =

New Zealand outlaw

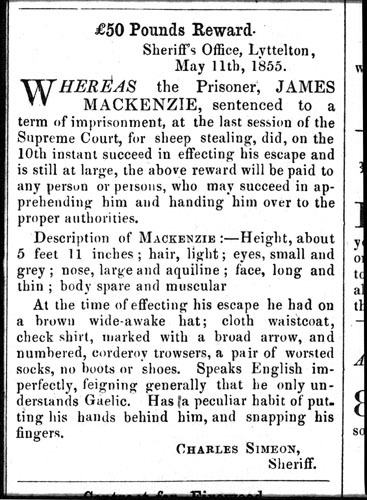
Reward poster published in The Lyttelton Times in May 1855 offering a reward for the capture of James Mckenzie after he escaped from prison where he was being held for stealing sheep

James Mckenzie (or in his native Scottish Gaelic: Seumas MacCoinnich), possibly born in Ross-shire, Scotland, in about 1820 was an outlaw who has become one of New Zealand's most enduring folk heroes. The correct spelling of Mckenzie is unclear and he is variously referred to as James, John or Jock. His surname has been spelt as both 'MacKenzie' and 'McKenzie' – the latter being more commonly used. He may also have had at least one alias, John Douglass.

Mckenzie emigrated to Australia in about 1849, arriving in Melbourne where he purchased a team of bullocks for carrying goods to the gold-diggings. He managed to save £1,000 and moved to New Zealand, arriving at Nelson. He worked as a drover in Canterbury before moving on to Otago where he applied for a land grant in the Mataura district.

In March 1855, Mckenzie was caught stealing 1,000 sheep from Levels Station, north of Timaru. After escaping his accusers, he walked 160 kilometres (99 miles) to Lyttelton, where he was caught by the police. He was subsequently sentenced to five years hard labour after being found guilty by a Lyttelton Supreme Court jury in April 1855.

He escaped from prison on at least two occasions, in May and June 1855, neither escape lasting more than three days, after which he was placed in irons and closely watched. In September 1855, the Christchurch resident magistrate investigated Mckenzie's case and found serious flaws in the police inquiry and trial. Mckenzie was given an unconditional pardon on 11 January 1856 after spending only nine months in prison.

After being freed, Mckenzie sailed for Australia from Lyttelton in January 1856, but nothing certain is known of his later life.

== In history and fiction ==
The New Zealand area known as Mackenzie Country is named in his honour.

A novel based partly on Mckenzie's life, Chandler's Run, by Denise Muir, was published in 2008.

New Zealand folk musician Mike Harding made him the subject of his ballad, 'McKenzie Song', originally composed by Kath Tait in 1973 as 'McKenzie's Ghost'.

James McNeish’s book The Mackenzie Affair was adapted for television in 1977.

James McKenzie is a character in Sarah Lark's 2007 novel, In the Land of the Long White Cloud.
