= Canterbury earthquake =

Canterbury earthquake can refer to:

- 1888 North Canterbury earthquake
- 1901 Cheviot earthquake that caused building damage in Christchurch.
- 2010 Canterbury earthquake
- 2011 Christchurch earthquake
- 2016 Kaikōura earthquake

== See also ==
- List of earthquakes in New Zealand
