= Shaky Isles =

Nickname for New Zealand

The Shaky Isles or Shaky Islands is a nickname for New Zealand. At one time this nickname was used in New Zealand itself, though its usage there is now seen as dated; it is still fairly widely used in Australia.

The name derived from New Zealand's frequent seismic activity. The islands lie on the margin of two colliding tectonic plates, the Pacific and Indo-Australian Plates. Earthquakes are common, particularly in the southwest of the South Island and in the central North Island, and the North Island's scenery is marked by several active and dormant volcanic cones.

The phrase is at worst only very mildly derogatory, and is usually only used humorously with no pejorative connotations.

The country records more than 14,000 earthquakes a year – but only about 150 are usually felt. Schoolchildren in the country regularly undertake earthquake drills.

== Historical references ==
Usage of the term "Shaky Isles" in the earlier half of the 20th century indicates a certain sensitivity on the subject among New Zealanders.

"New Zealand need not worry about the untruthful nickname 'Shaky Isles,' which appears occasionally in Australian papers, when a report of an earthquake is cabled across the Tasman Sea," the New Zealand Railways Magazine assured its readers in 1929.

In 1932 (the year after the Hawke's Bay earthquake in New Zealand's North Island killed 256 people) New Zealand's Leader of the Opposition, Australian-born Harry Holland, warned New Zealand's Parliament of "the serious damage that is being done to New Zealand by the grossly exaggerated and untruthful statements that are published overseas regarding earthquakes, riots, fires, and floods…"

Holland told Parliament: "I visited Australia less than two years ago, and almost invariably when my name appeared in the newspapers I was described as a visitor from the land of shakes. My son was manager of the New Zealand hockey team which toured Australia. They visited Queensland, Victoria, and New South Wales, and some of them went as far as South Australia. He brought back with him clippings from a number of newspapers, in which he and his team were described as the hockey team from the Shaky Isles. He says that when people got off the boat at Sydney they were looked upon as being very fortunate to have escaped from New Zealand, because of the continual shakes. I think the time has come when the Government would be well advised to impose a very much stricter censorship over the damaging cable messages that are sent out."

== In popular culture ==
The term "Shaky Isles" has been used multiple times in New Zealand popular culture as a reference to the country. Among the earliest uses of the term was by the Maori Troubadours in 1960, with their song Shakin' in the Shaky Isles. This was followed up in later decades by Mike Harding in 1989 and Dave Dobbyn in 1991. A New Zealand theatre company headed by Emma Deakin in London is called "The Shaky Isles Theatre Company". "Shaky Isles" is also the name of a cafe chain in Auckland.

== See also ==
- List of earthquakes in New Zealand
