= 1947 Gisborne earthquakes and tsunami =

Earthquakes in New Zealand

- Location within New Zealand
- UTC time: 1947-03-25 20:32:20
- 1947-05-17 07:06:41
- ISC event: 897790
- 897857
- USGS-ANSS: ComCat
- ComCat
- Magnitude: 7.7 M_{w}
- 7.6 M_{w}
- Depth: 15 km (9.3 mi)
- Epicenter: 38.676°S 178.533°E
- Fault: Hikurangi Margin
- Areas affected: New Zealand
- Tsunami: Yes
- Casualties: None

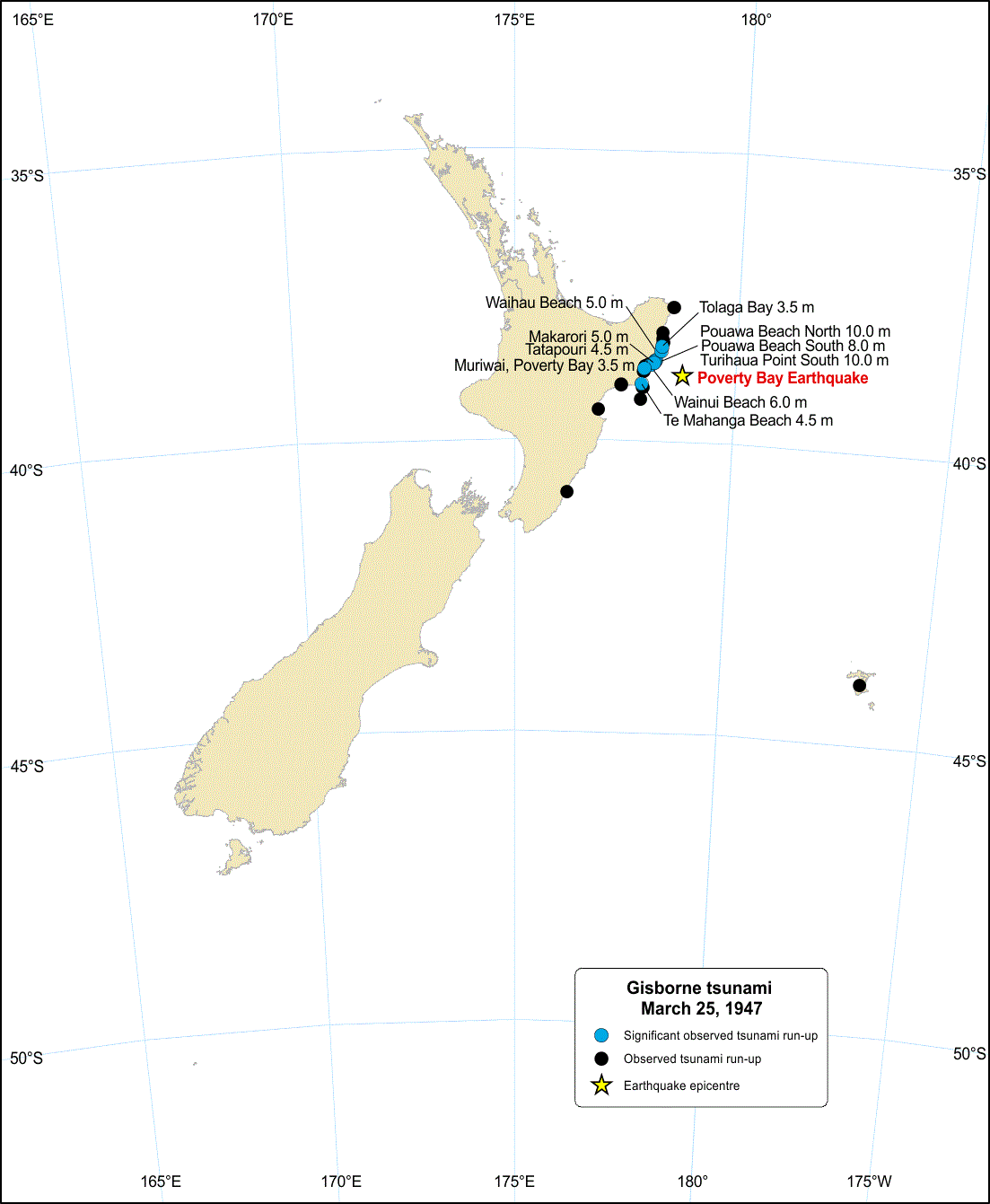
Run-up for the 25 March tsunami

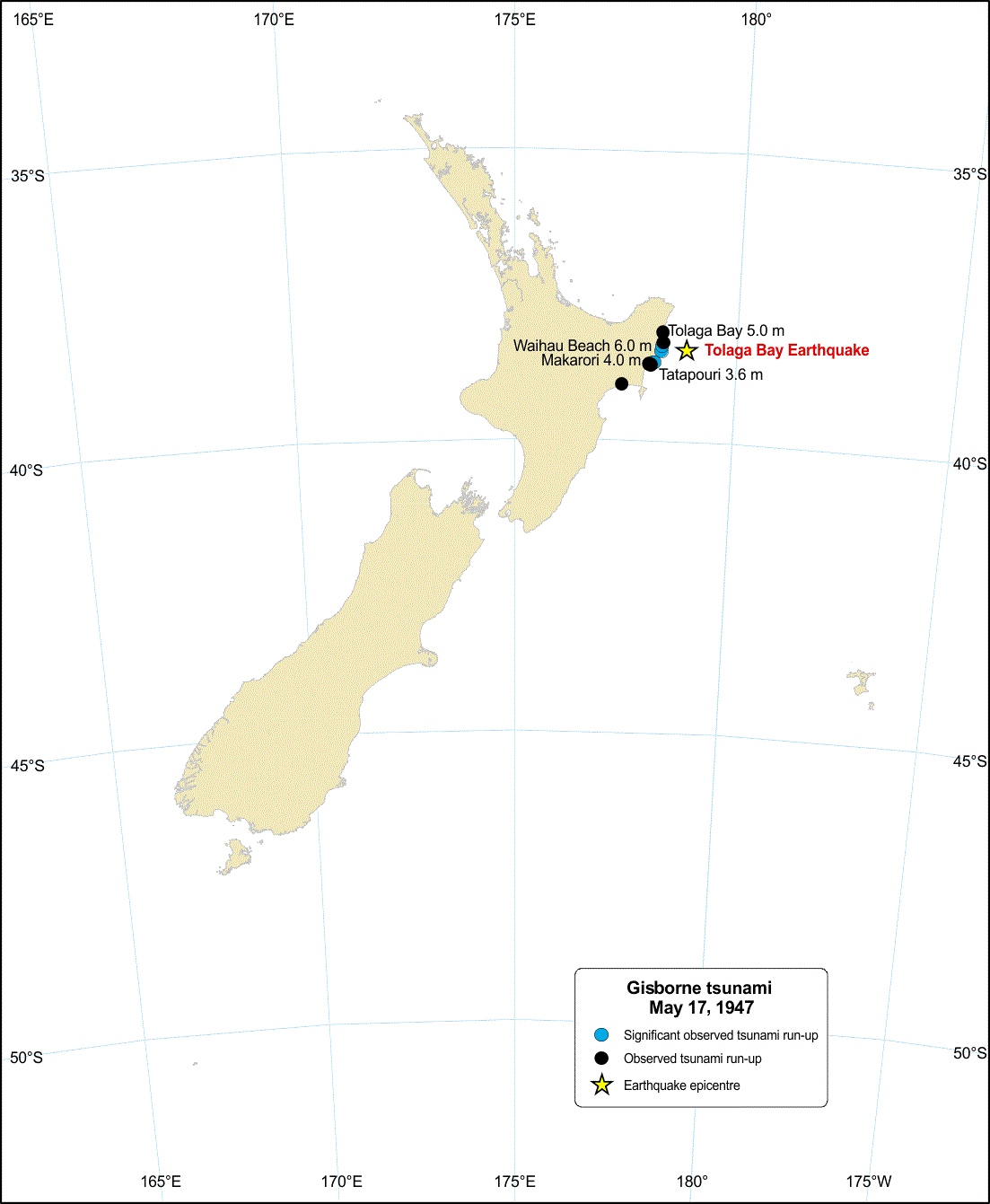
Run-up for the 17 May tsunami

The 1947 Gisborne earthquakes and tsunami occurred east of Gisborne and offshore from New Zealand's North Island. Both earthquakes measured 7.7 and 7.6 on the moment magnitude scale, and generated large tsunamis, although there were no casualties.

== Tectonic setting ==
New Zealand lies along the boundary between the Indo-Australian and Pacific plates. In the North Island the displacement is mainly taken up along the Hikurangi Subduction Zone, although the remaining dextral strike-slip component of the relative plate motion is accommodated by the North Island Fault System. Both earthquakes are believed to have occurred along the Hikurangi Subduction Zone, in close proximity to each other. Both earthquakes generated tsunami caused by the sudden release of energy from the Earth's crust. Due to the unusually large tsunami that accompanied the earthquake, and the lack of damage due to weak shaking, this event has been identified as a rare "tsunami earthquake".

== Earthquakes ==
The first earthquake, which struck offshore Poverty Bay on 26 March 1947 at 8:32 am NZST, measured 7.7 M_{w}. It generated a tsunami with a maximum measured run-up height of 10 metres that struck the coast from Māhia Peninsula to Tokomaru Bay, swamping the coast between Muriwai and Tolaga Bay 30 minutes after the quake. The tsunami was not observed outside of New Zealand. Four people at the Tatapouri Hotel, 13 kilometres by road north of Gisborne, saw the tsunami coming and rushed up a hill. Two waves swept through the ground floor of the hotel up to window sill height, and retreating water then washed small buildings out to sea. A little further north at Turihaua, a 10-metre high wave hit a cottage, sweeping two men who were outside it inland onto the coast road. Three other people were trapped in the kitchen, which filled with water to head height. Retreating water then destroyed the cottage, leaving only the kitchen. The Pouawa River bridge, a little further north, was swept 800 metres inland. Seaweed was later found in telegraph wires 12 metres above sea level at Pouawa Beach. A house at Mahanga Beach, just north of Māhia Peninsula, was moved off its piles.

Seven weeks later, a second earthquake struck offshore Tolaga Bay on 17 May, and was estimated at 7.6 M_{w}. It also generated a tsunami, which had a maximum measured run-up height of 6 metres. Despite occurring at low tide and being less powerful than the first, the tsunami caused small amounts of damage along the east coast and is noted for washing away construction materials being used to repair damage from the earlier tsunami. No one died in either of the tsunamis, but there could have been a high toll had they struck when beaches were crowded during summer holidays.

== See also ==
- List of earthquakes in 1947
- List of earthquakes in New Zealand
