= 1863 Hawke's Bay earthquake =

Earthquake in New Zealand

- Location within New Zealand
- UTC time: 1863-02-22 12:15
- Local date: 23 February 1863
- Local time: 01:15 NZDT (UTC+13)
- Magnitude: 7.5 M_{w}
- Depth: 25 kilometres (16 mi)
- Epicentre: 40.00°S 176.50°E
- Areas affected: New Zealand

The 1863 Hawke's Bay earthquake was a devastating magnitude 7.5 M_{w} earthquake that struck near the town of Waipukurau, New Zealand, on 23 February 1863. It remained the single largest earthquake to strike Hawke's Bay until 1931, where a magnitude 7.8 quake levelled much of Napier and Hastings, and killed 256 people.

== Tectonic setting ==
New Zealand lies along the boundary between the Indo-Australian plate and Pacific plates. In the South Island most of the relative displacement between these plates is taken up along a single dextral (right lateral) strike-slip fault with a major reverse component, the Alpine Fault. In the North Island the displacement is mainly taken up along the Hikurangi Subduction Zone, although the remaining dextral strike-slip component of the relative plate motion is accommodated by the North Island Fault System (NIFS), which runs from Wellington, up Hawke's Bay and through to Gisborne and the Bay of Plenty. The 1863 earthquake is believed to have occurred outside the Mohaka Fault, just west of Waipukurau.

== Reported effects ==
Residents living in Hawke's Bay at the time reported numerous landslides, as well as vast soil liquefaction and the opening of large fissures in the ground. Residents also reported overturned furniture and snapped chimneys. According to The Hawke's Bay Herald, there was considerable damage to stock in stores and hotels, and although some chimney bricks fell through roofs, no major injuries were reported. Houses were shaken off their piles. Aftershocks continued at short intervals for the rest of the morning.

Outside of Hawke's Bay, the earthquake woke many people in Wellington, causing minor structural damage but had a large toll on personal belongings. The Wellington Independent noted that the initial earthquake lasted 30–40 seconds and was followed by several smaller aftershocks.

In Wanganui, the earthquake was described as the sharpest shock in both duration and severity since the magnitude 8.2 Wairarapa earthquake in 1855. However, no damage was sustained.

In Nelson the earthquake was felt as three sharp shocks in quick succession at about 1:20 a.m.

In Gisborne the earthquake was felt, but did not cause any damage.

== See also ==
- List of earthquakes in New Zealand
- List of historical earthquakes
