= List of earthquakes in 1914 =

Earthquakes in 1914
Approximate epicenters of the earthquakes in 1914
- 4.0–5.9 magnitude
- 6.0–6.9 magnitude
- 7.0–7.9 magnitude
- 8.0+ magnitude
- Strongest: Dutch East Indies, off the northern coast of Papua (province) (Magnitude 8.1) May 26
- Deadliest: Ottoman Empire, Burdur Province, (Magnitude 7.0) October 3 4,000 deaths
- Total fatalities: 4,380+

Number by magnitude
- 9.0+: 0

This is a list of earthquakes in 1914. Only magnitude 6.0 or greater earthquakes appear on the list. Lower magnitude events are included if they have caused death, injury or damage. Events which occurred in remote areas will be excluded from the list as they wouldn't have generated significant media interest. All dates are listed according to UTC time. A fairly busy year with 17 events exceeding magnitude 7. The largest of these was a magnitude 8.1 in Indonesia in May. The deadliest event of the year was in Turkey in October with 4,000 deaths. Several other events resulted in sizable death tolls. Italy, Dutch East Indies and Japan were affected.

== Overall ==
=== By death toll ===
Rank	Death toll	Magnitude	Location	MMI	Depth (km)	Date
1	4,000	7.0	Ottoman Empire, Burdur Province	IX (Violent)	15.0	October 3
2	120	4.9	Kingdom of Italy, Giarre, Province of Catania	X (Extreme)	0.0	May 8
3	101	8.1	Dutch East Indies, off the northern coast of Papua (province)	IX (Violent)	15.0	May 26
4	94	7.0	Empire of Japan, Akita Prefecture, Honshu	( )	5.0	March 14
5	29	6.7	Empire of Japan, Kagoshima Prefecture, Kyushu	( )	5.0	January 12
6	20	7.6	Dutch East Indies, off southwest coast of Sumatra	( )	35.0	June 25
7	14	6.3	Greece, Lefkada	IX (Violent)	30.0	November 27

- Note: At least 10 casualties

=== By magnitude ===
Rank	Magnitude	Death toll	Location	MMI	Depth (km)	Date
1	8.1	101	Dutch East Indies off the northern coast of Papua (province)	IX (Violent)	15.0	May 26
2	7.9	0	Empire of Japan, Volcano Islands	( )	110.0	November 24
= 3	7.6	0	Chile, off the coast of Bio-Bio Region	( )	15.0	January 30
= 3	7.6	20	Dutch East Indies, off southwest coast of Sumatra	( )	35.0	June 25
= 4	7.4	0	France, east of Guadeloupe	( )	100.0	October 3
= 4	7.4	0	Dutch East Indies, north of Halmahera	( )	35.0	October 23
5	7.3	1	China, northern Xinjiang Province	VIII (Severe)	15.0	August 4
= 6	7.2	0	Bolivia, Oruro Department	( )	130.0	February 26
= 6	7.2	0	Mexico, Chiapas	( )	150.0	March 30
= 6	7.2	0	British Solomon Islands, south of	( )	50.0	April 11
= 6	7.2	0	British Raj, Andaman Islands	( )	80.0	October 11
7	7.1	0	Dutch East Indies, Banda Sea	( )	200.0	July 4
= 8	7.0	0	Russian Empire, off the east coast of Kamchatka	( )	60.0	January 20
= 8	7.0	94	Empire of Japan, Akita Prefecture, Honshu	( )	5.0	March 14
= 8	7.0	0	British Solomon Islands, Santa Cruz Islands	( )	50.0	June 20
= 8	7.0	4,000	Ottoman Empire, Burdur Province	IX (Violent)	15.0	October 3
= 8	7.0	0	New Zealand, Waikato region, North Island	( )	100.0	November 22

- Note: At least 7.0 magnitude

== Notable events ==
=== January ===
January
- Strongest: 7.6 M_{w} Chile
- Deadliest: 6.7 M_{w} Empire of Japan; 29 deaths
- Total fatalities: 29

Number by magnitude
- 8.0–8.9: 0
- 7.0–7.9: 2
- 6.0–6.9: 1

Date	Country and location	M_{w}	Depth (km)	MMI	Notes	Casualties	
Date	Country and location	M_{w}	Depth (km)	MMI	Notes	Dead	Injured
12	Empire of Japan, Kagoshima Prefecture, Kyushu	6.7	5.0		When the earthquake struck the Sakurajima volcano erupted. The earthquake itself caused 29 deaths and 120 homes to collapse.	29	
20	Russian Empire, off the east coast of Kamchatka	7.0	60.0				
30	Chile, off the coast of Bio-Bio Region	7.6	15.0				

=== February ===
February
- Strongest: 7.2 M_{w} Bolivia
- Total fatalities: 0

Number by magnitude
- 8.0–8.9: 0
- 7.0–7.9: 1
- 6.0–6.9: 2

Date	Country and location	M_{w}	Depth (km)	MMI	Notes	Casualties	
Date	Country and location	M_{w}	Depth (km)	MMI	Notes	Dead	Injured
6	British Raj, Balochistan, Pakistan	6.8	100.0				
7	Empire of Japan, off the east coast of Honshu	6.8	35.0				
26	Bolivia, Oruro Department	7.2	130.0				

=== March ===
March
- Strongest: 7.2 M_{w} Mexico
- Deadliest: 7.0 M_{w} Japan; 94 deaths
- Total fatalities: 94

Number by magnitude
- 8.0–8.9: 0
- 7.0–7.9: 2
- 6.0–6.9: 1

Date	Country and location	M_{w}	Depth (km)	MMI	Notes	Casualties	
Date	Country and location	M_{w}	Depth (km)	MMI	Notes	Dead	Injured
14	Japan, Akita Prefecture, Honshu	7.0	5.0		The 1914 Senboku earthquake caused 94 deaths. 640 homes were destroyed.	94	
28	China, Yunnan Province	6.7	100.0				
30	Mexico, Chiapas	7.2	150.0				

=== April ===
April
- Strongest: 7.2 M_{w} British Solomon Islands
- Total fatalities: 0

Number by magnitude
- 8.0–8.9: 0
- 7.0–7.9: 1
- 6.0–6.9: 0

Date	Country and location	M_{w}	Depth (km)	MMI	Notes	Casualties	
Date	Country and location	M_{w}	Depth (km)	MMI	Notes	Dead	Injured
11	British Solomon Islands, south of	7.2	50.0				

=== May ===
May
- Strongest: 8.1 M_{w} Dutch East Indies
- Deadliest: 4.9 M_{w} Italy; 120 deaths
- Total fatalities: 221+

Number by magnitude
- 8.0–8.9: 1
- 7.0–7.9: 0
- 6.0–6.9: 2

Date	Country and location	M_{w}	Depth (km)	MMI	Notes	Casualties	
Date	Country and location	M_{w}	Depth (km)	MMI	Notes	Dead	Injured
8	Italy, Giarre, Province of Catania	4.9	0.0	X	120 deaths were caused as well as the destruction of 223 homes. Depth unknown.	120	
24	Portuguese Angola, Cuanza Sul Province	6.0	35.0				
26	Dutch East Indies, off the north coast of Papua (province)	8.1	15.0	IX	At least 101 people were killed and many homes were destroyed. A tsunami contributed to the destruction.	101+	
28	Panama, Kuna de Wargandi	6.9	70.0				

=== June ===
June
- Strongest: 7.6 M_{w} Dutch East Indies
- Deadliest: 7.6 M_{w} Dutch East Indies; 20 deaths
- Total fatalities: 20

Number by magnitude
- 8.0–8.9: 0
- 7.0–7.9: 2
- 6.0–6.9: 0

Date	Country and location	M_{w}	Depth (km)	MMI	Notes	Casualties	
Date	Country and location	M_{w}	Depth (km)	MMI	Notes	Dead	Injured
20	British Solomon Islands, Santa Cruz Islands	7.0	50.0				
25	Dutch East Indies, off the southwest coast of Sumatra	7.6	35.0		20 people were killed and another 20 were injured. A few homes were destroyed.	20	20

=== July ===
July
- Strongest: 7.1 M_{w} Dutch East Indies
- Total fatalities: 0

Number by magnitude
- 8.0–8.9: 0
- 7.0–7.9: 1
- 6.0–6.9: 2

Date	Country and location	M_{w}	Depth (km)	MMI	Notes	Casualties	
Date	Country and location	M_{w}	Depth (km)	MMI	Notes	Dead	Injured
4	Japan, northwest of the Ryukyu Islands	6.7	200.0				
4	Dutch East Indies, Banda Sea	7.1	200.0				
6	Taiwan, off the east coast	6.6	60.0				

=== August ===
August
- Strongest: 7.3 M_{w} China
- Deadliest: 7.3 M_{w} China; 1 death
- Total fatalities: 1

Number by magnitude
- 8.0–8.9: 0
- 7.0–7.9: 1
- 6.0–6.9: 2

Date	Country and location	M_{w}	Depth (km)	MMI	Notes	Casualties	
Date	Country and location	M_{w}	Depth (km)	MMI	Notes	Dead	Injured
3	Jamaica, north of	6.0	35.0				
4	China, northern Xinjiang Province	7.3	15.0	VIII	1 person was killed and some homes were destroyed.	1	
6	Dutch East Indies, Flores Sea	6.7	600.0				

=== September ===
September
- Strongest: 6.5 M_{w} Russian Empire
- Total fatalities: 0

Number by magnitude
- 8.0–8.9: 0
- 7.0–7.9: 0
- 6.0–6.9: 1

Date	Country and location	M_{w}	Depth (km)	MMI	Notes	Casualties	
Date	Country and location	M_{w}	Depth (km)	MMI	Notes	Dead	Injured
11	Russian Empire, Kuril Islands	6.5	35.0				

=== October ===
October
- Strongest: 7.4 M_{w} 2 events
- Deadliest: 7.0 M_{w} Ottoman Empire; 4,000 deaths
- Total fatalities: 4,001

Number by magnitude
- 8.0–8.9: 0
- 7.0–7.9: 4
- 6.0–6.9: 4

Date	Country and location	M_{w}	Depth (km)	MMI	Notes	Casualties	
Date	Country and location	M_{w}	Depth (km)	MMI	Notes	Dead	Injured
3	France, east of Guadeloupe	7.4	100.0				
3	Ottoman Empire, Burdur Province	7.0	15.0	IX	At least 4,000 deaths were caused by the 1914 Burdur earthquake. Another 700 people were injured. Extensive damage was caused with over 17,000 homes collapsing.	4,000	700
7	New Zealand, Gisborne Region	6.6	12.0	IX	The 1914 East Cape earthquakes caused 1 death as well as some damage.	1	
9	British Raj, Himachal Pradesh	6.3	20.0				
11	British Raj, Andaman Islands	7.2	80.0				
17	Greece, Central Greece (region)	6.0	0.0	X	Depth unknown.		
23	Dutch East Indies, north of Halmahera	7.4	35.0				
28	New Zealand, off the east coast of North Island	6.5	35.0				

=== November ===
November
- Strongest: 7.9 M_{w} Japan
- Deadliest: 6.3 M_{w} Greece; 14 deaths
- Total fatalities: 14

Number by magnitude
- 8.0–8.9: 0
- 7.0–7.9: 2
- 6.0–6.9: 2

Date	Country and location	M_{w}	Depth (km)	MMI	Notes	Casualties	
Date	Country and location	M_{w}	Depth (km)	MMI	Notes	Dead	Injured
22	New Zealand, Waikato region, North Island	7.0	100.0				
24	Japan, Volcano Islands	7.9	110.0				
27	Greece, Lefkada	6.3	30.0	IX	14 people were killed. Many homes were damaged or destroyed.	14	
28	Japan, Ryukyu Islands	6.9	35.0				

=== December ===
December
- Strongest: 6.7 M_{w} Peru
- Deadliest: 6.7 M_{w} Peru; 400 deaths
- Total fatalities: 400

Number by magnitude
- 8.0–8.9: 0
- 7.0–7.9: 0
- 6.0–6.9: 1

Date	Country and location	M_{w}	Depth (km)	MMI	Notes	Casualties	
Date	Country and location	M_{w}	Depth (km)	MMI	Notes	Dead	Injured
2	Peru, Ayacucho Region, Parinacochas Province	6.7	400.0		The Marcabamba church tumbled down.	400	
