= 1914 Burdur earthquake =

1914 earthquake in Burdur Province, Turkey

- Location within Turkey
- UTC time: 1914-10-03 22:07:07
- ISC event
- USGS-ANSS: ComCat
- Local date: October 4, 1914
- Local time: 00:07
- Magnitude: 7.0 M_{s}
- Epicenter: 37.82°N 30.27°E
- Areas affected: Ottoman Empire
- Max. intensity: MMI IX (Violent)
- Casualties: 2,344

The 1914 Burdur earthquake (also called the Afyon-Bolvadin earthquake) occurred at 00:07 local time (22:07 UTC) on 4 October. It was estimated to be 7.0 on the surface-wave magnitude scale with a maximum intensity of IX (Violent) on the Mercalli intensity scale. It was centered near Lake Burdur in southwestern Anatolia and the mainshock and subsequent fire destroyed more than 17,000 homes, and caused 2,344 casualties.

== Earthquake ==
The earthquake, along with several others in 1959 and 1971, occurred along the Fethiye-Burdur fault zone, a parallel and discontinuous series of fault segments. No unambiguous fault displacement has been found that is related to the event, but a 23 km (14 mi) portion of the southeast coast of Lake Burdur experienced subsidence of up to 150 centimeters (59 in) and this may indicate that the event was due to normal faulting with a strike of N45°E.

== Damage ==
In Burdur nearly all homes were destroyed along with other significant and historical monuments. Kilinc was destroyed and in Keciborlu around 85 percent of the houses were lost. In the city of Isparta the great Mosque was destroyed along with more than half of the homes. Other villages were also impacted as far as 60 kilometers (37 mi) from the epicenter.

== See also ==
- List of earthquakes in 1914
- List of earthquakes in Turkey
