= 1891 Port Waikato earthquake =

Earthquake in New Zealand

- Location within New Zealand
- Local date: 23 June 1891
- Magnitude: M_{L} 5.7 – 5.9
- M_{w} 6.0 – 6.2
- Depth: <30 km
- Epicentre: 37.4°S 174.7°E
- Fault: Waikato Fault
- Type: Normal
- Areas affected: Waikato, Auckland (New Zealand)
- Total damage: Minor
- Max. intensity: MMI VII (Very strong)
- Tsunami: No
- Casualties: None

The 1891 Port Waikato earthquake occurred on 23 June in the Waikato District of New Zealand, with an estimated local magnitude of 5.7–5.9. The maximum Mercalli intensity may have been VII (Very strong), especially around the Waikato River mouth region.

The earthquake's epicentre is suggested to be close to the mouth of the Waikato River, based on local newspaper, lighthouse reports and intensity report. The possibly active Waikato Fault may have been the cause of the earthquake.

Much of Auckland felt an intensity of VI (Strong). This quake caused considerable excitement among residents of the city and surrounding areas as earthquakes were rare and none were near the strength of the 1891 event. A few chimneys in the Auckland region were damaged; a few toppled over; and some shop display windows and crockery were shattered.

== See also ==
- List of earthquakes in New Zealand
- List of historical earthquakes
- Auckland regional faults
