= Pouawa River =

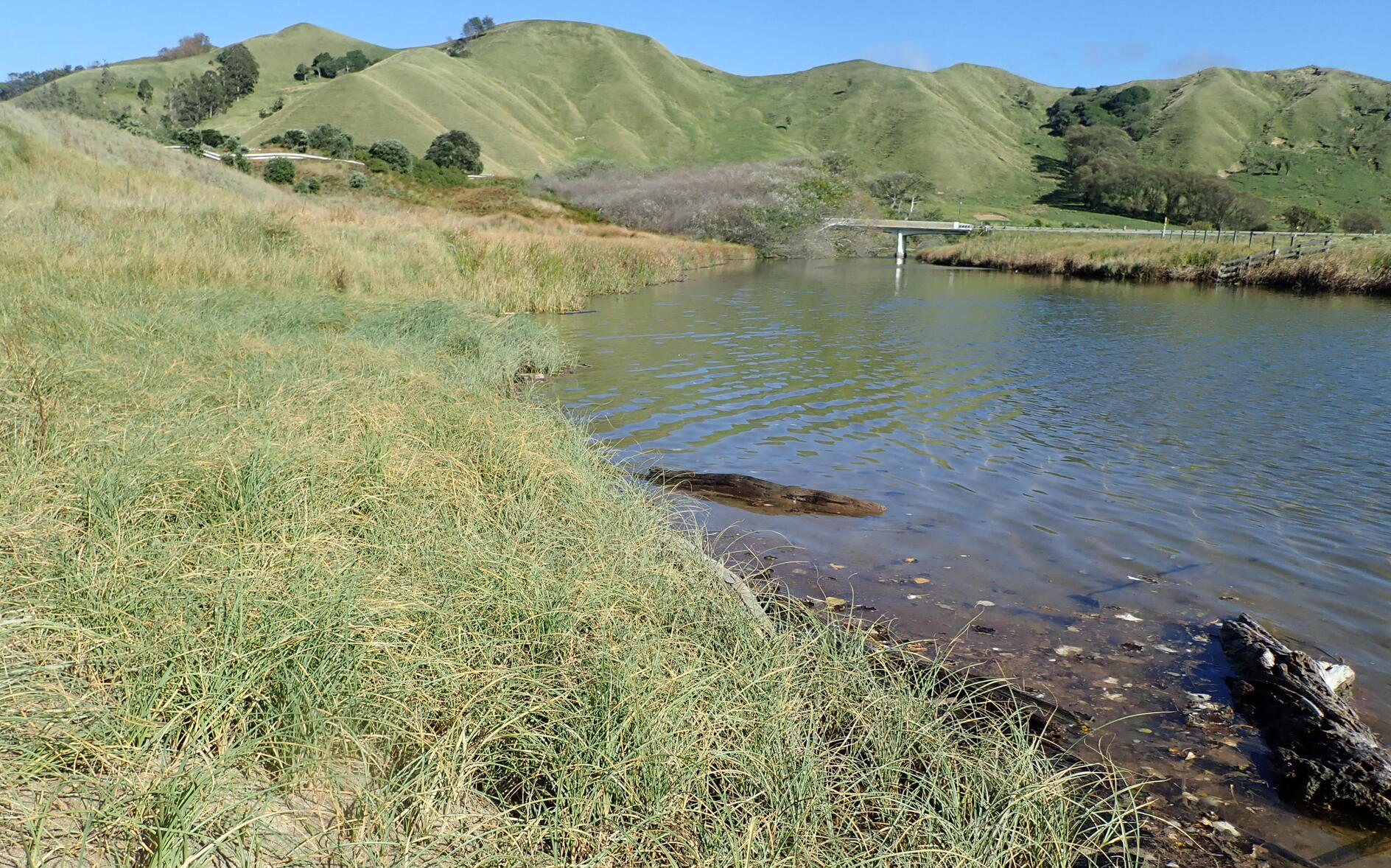
- Pouawa River looking towards the Pouawa River Bridge crossing of State Highway 35
- Route of the Pouawa River
- Mouth of the Pouawa River Pouawa River (North Island)
- Native name: Pouawa (Māori)

Location
- Country: New Zealand
- Island: North Island
- Region: Gisborne

Physical characteristics
- Source: Confluence of Tangamatai Stream and Tārewarewa Stream
  - coordinates: 38.58298°S 178.17937°E
- Mouth: Pacific Ocean
  - coordinates: 38°36′24″S 178°11′15″E
- Length: 15 km (9.3 mi)

Basin features
- Progression: Pouawa River → Pacific Ocean
- Bridges: Pouawa River Bridge (3080)

The Pouawa River is a river of the Gisborne Region of New Zealand's North Island. It flows predominantly southeast, reaching the Pacific Ocean 15 kilometres (9 mi) northeast of Gisborne.

== See also ==
- List of rivers of New Zealand
