= Wharekahika River =

- Route of the Wharekahika River
- Mouth of the Wharekahika River Wharekahika River (North Island)

Location
- Country: New Zealand

Physical characteristics
- Source: Confluence of Ōweka Stream and Mangapurua Stream
  - coordinates: 37°34′14″S 178°08′51″E
- Mouth
  - location: Wharekahika / Hicks Bay
  - coordinates: 37°34′27″S 178°17′34″E
- Length: 24 km (15 mi)

Basin features
- Progression: Wharekahika River → Wharekahika / Hicks Bay → Pacific Ocean
- Tributaries
  - left: Tapirau Stream, Makarae Stream
  - right: Mangaomeko Stream, Mangatutu Stream
- Bridges: Wharekahika Bridge

The Wharekahika River is a river of the Gisborne Region of New Zealand's North Island. It flows east, its course paralleling the north coast of the Gisborne Region, and reaches the sea at Hicks Bay.

== See also ==
- List of rivers of New Zealand
