= List of earthquakes in New Zealand =

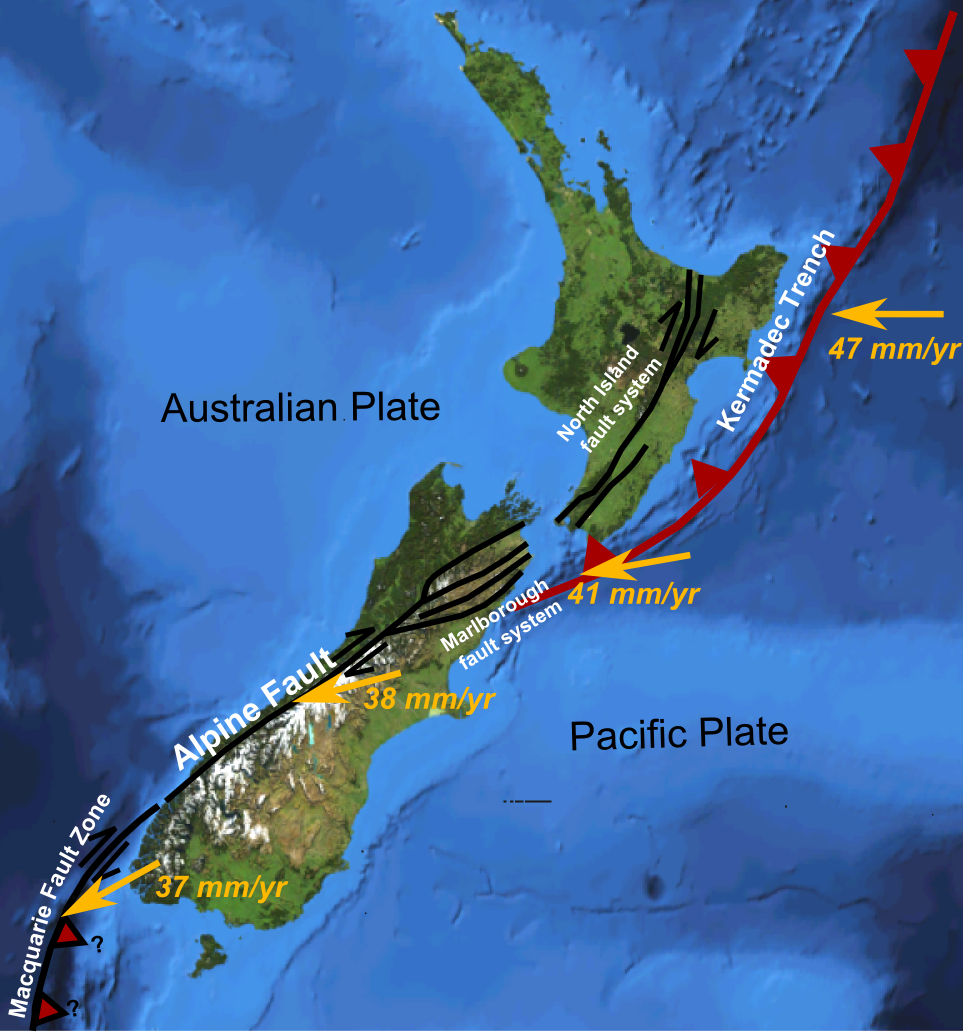
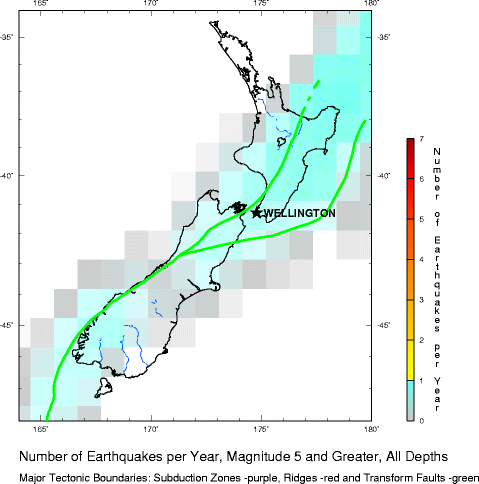
Major active fault zones of New Zealand showing variation in displacement vector along the Pacific–Indo-Australian plate boundary (left) and the distribution of earthquakes (magnitude 5 or greater)

New Zealand earthquakes 1960 to 2020
Magnitude	Annual average
4.0–4.9	355.9
5.0–5.9	29.28
6.0–6.9	1.66
7.0–7.9	0.26
8.0 and over	0.01

This is a list of large earthquakes that have occurred in New Zealand. Only earthquakes with a magnitude of 6.0 or greater are listed, except for a few that had a moderate impact. Aftershocks are not included, unless they were of great significance or contributed to a death toll, such as the M 6.3 2011 Christchurch earthquake and the M 7.3 aftershock to the 1931 Hawke's Bay earthquake.

Earthquakes occur frequently in New Zealand as the country is situated in the collision zone between the Indo-Australian and Pacific plates, part of the Pacific Basin Ring of Fire, where many earthquakes and volcanoes occur. Most events occur along the main ranges running from Fiordland in the southwest to East Cape in the northeast. This axis follows the boundary between the Indo-Australian and Pacific plates. Large earthquakes are less common, where the plates are not subducting and the forces are accommodated in different ways.

The largest city within the highest-risk zone is the nation's capital, Wellington, followed by Napier then Hastings. All these cities have experienced severe earthquakes since European settlement. About 14,000 earthquakes occur in and around the country each year, of which between 150 and 200 are big enough to be felt. As a result, New Zealand has very stringent building regulations. The 1929 Murchison earthquake and 1931 Hawke's Bay earthquake led to the development of stricter building codes in New Zealand from 1935.

Quite early on, European settlers were faced with the reality of earthquakes in their new home. On 26 May 1840, the new settlement at Port Nicholson was struck by the first of a number of earthquakes and tremors. Early settlers learned fairly quickly the importance of using appropriate building methods in an earthquake-prone country. The 1848 earthquake, centred in Marlborough, caused great damage to the brick and masonry buildings in Wellington, and the city was rebuilt mainly in wood; consequently it suffered comparatively little damage in the 8.2 magnitude earthquake of 1855, which lifted the land 2–3m. Many buildings in Hastings and Napier were damaged in the 1931 Hawke's Bay earthquake. New building regulations meant that any new buildings constructed afterwards attempted to take earthquake shaking into account in building design.

== Pre-19th century ==
Date	Location	Region	Magnitude		Depth	Latitude	Longitude	Further information
Date	Location	Region	(M_{L})	(M_{W})	Depth	Latitude	Longitude	Further information
1100	Alpine Fault	South Island	7.6–8.3					
1450	Alpine Fault	South Island	7.6–8.3					
1460	Wellington Region	Wellington	8.0	8.0	25 km	41.39°S	174.80°E	Haowhenua earthquake
1620	Alpine Fault	South Island	7.6–8.3					
1717	Alpine Fault	South Island	8.1					

== 19th century ==
Information for earthquakes before 1840 are later estimates.

Date	Location	Region	Magnitude		Depth	Latitude	Longitude	Fatalities	Further information
Date	Location	Region	(M_{L})	(M_{W})	Depth	Latitude	Longitude	Fatalities	Further information
1815	New Plymouth	Taranaki	6.5		25 km	38.99°S	174.00°E		
1817	Fiordland	South Island	6.5		25 km	45.99°S	167.00°E		
1826	Fiordland	South Island	7.5		25 km	44.99°S	167.00°E		
1835	South Auckland	Auckland	6.5		25 km	36.99°S	175.00°E		1835 Auckland earthquake – Apparently a large shallow earthquake followed by aftershocks. Evidence rests on a single report that has so far not been verified
1838	Waitotara Forest	Manawatu	6.5		25 km	39.39°S	176.10°E		
26 May 1840	Paraparaumu	Wellington	6.0		25 km	41.00°S	175.00°E		
8 July 1843	Near Taihape	Manawatu	7.6	7.6	12 km	39.59°S	176.20°E	2	1843 Wanganui earthquake
13 July 1846	Snares Islands	Southland	6.3		25 km	47.00°S	166.00°E		
19 November 1846	Karamea	West Coast	6.5		25 km	41.00°S	172.00°E		
4 December 1846	Wellington	Wellington	6.0		25 km	41.00°S	174.50°E		
16 October 1848	Blenheim	Marlborough	7.4	7.8	12 km	41.89°S	173.60°E	3	1848 Marlborough earthquake
27 July 1851	Motueka	Tasman	6.0		25 km	41.00°S	173.00°E		
23 January 1855	Lake Wairarapa	Wairarapa	8.2	8.2	33 km	41.198°S	175.20°E	9	1855 Wairarapa earthquake
23 February 1863	Waipukurau	Hawke's Bay	7.5		25 km	40.00°S	176.50°E		1863 Hawke's Bay earthquake
19 October 1868	Cape Farewell	Tasman	7.2		12 km	40.20°S	173.00°E		Felt throughout Central New Zealand
5 June 1869	Christchurch	Canterbury	4.7–5.7		5 km	43.55°S	172.60°E		1869 Christchurch earthquake
26 February 1876	Oamaru	Otago		5.8	12 km	45.20°S	170.90°E		Doublet earthquake: damaging in Oamaru & neighbouring settlements
18 July 1876	Palmerston North	Manawatu	6.8		50 km	40.19°S	175.80°E		Felt strongly in Palmerston North
25 June 1881	Palmerston North	Manawatu	6.7		33 km	40.39°S	175.60°E		Felt strongly in Palmerston North
5 December 1881	Castle Hill	Canterbury	6.0		12 km	43.13°S	171.77°E		1881 Castle Hill earthquake damaged buildings in Christchurch
1 September 1888	Lewis Pass	Canterbury	7.0	7.1	12 km	42.59°S	172.55°E	1	1888 North Canterbury earthquake
23 June 1891	W of Port Waikato	Waikato	6.2		12 km	37.43°S	174.43°E		1891 Port Waikato earthquake – Felt quite strongly in the Waikato and Auckland regions.
12 February 1893	Nelson	Tasman Bay	6.7		70 km	40.99°S	173.80°E		Felt throughout Central New Zealand
18 August 1895	Taupō	Bay of Plenty	6.0		12 km	38.80°S	176.80°E		Felt throughout Central New Zealand
8 December 1897	Wanganui	Manawatu	6.5		40 km	39.99°S,	175.00°E		Felt throughout North Island, Strong in Wanganui

== 1900–1949 ==
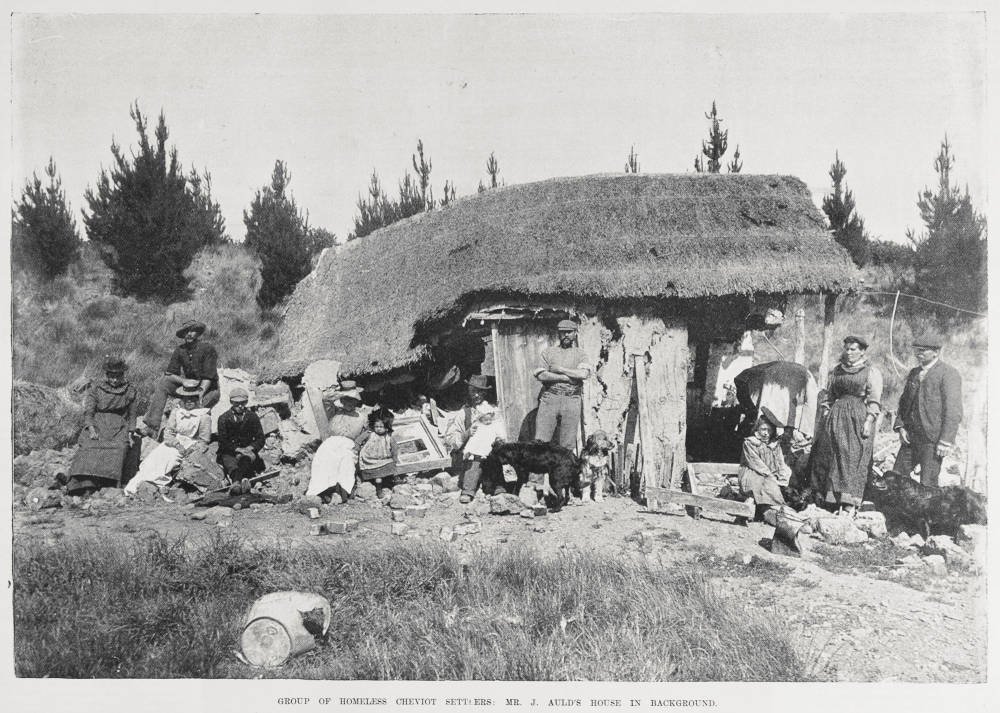
Damage to a house following the 1901 Cheviot earthquake

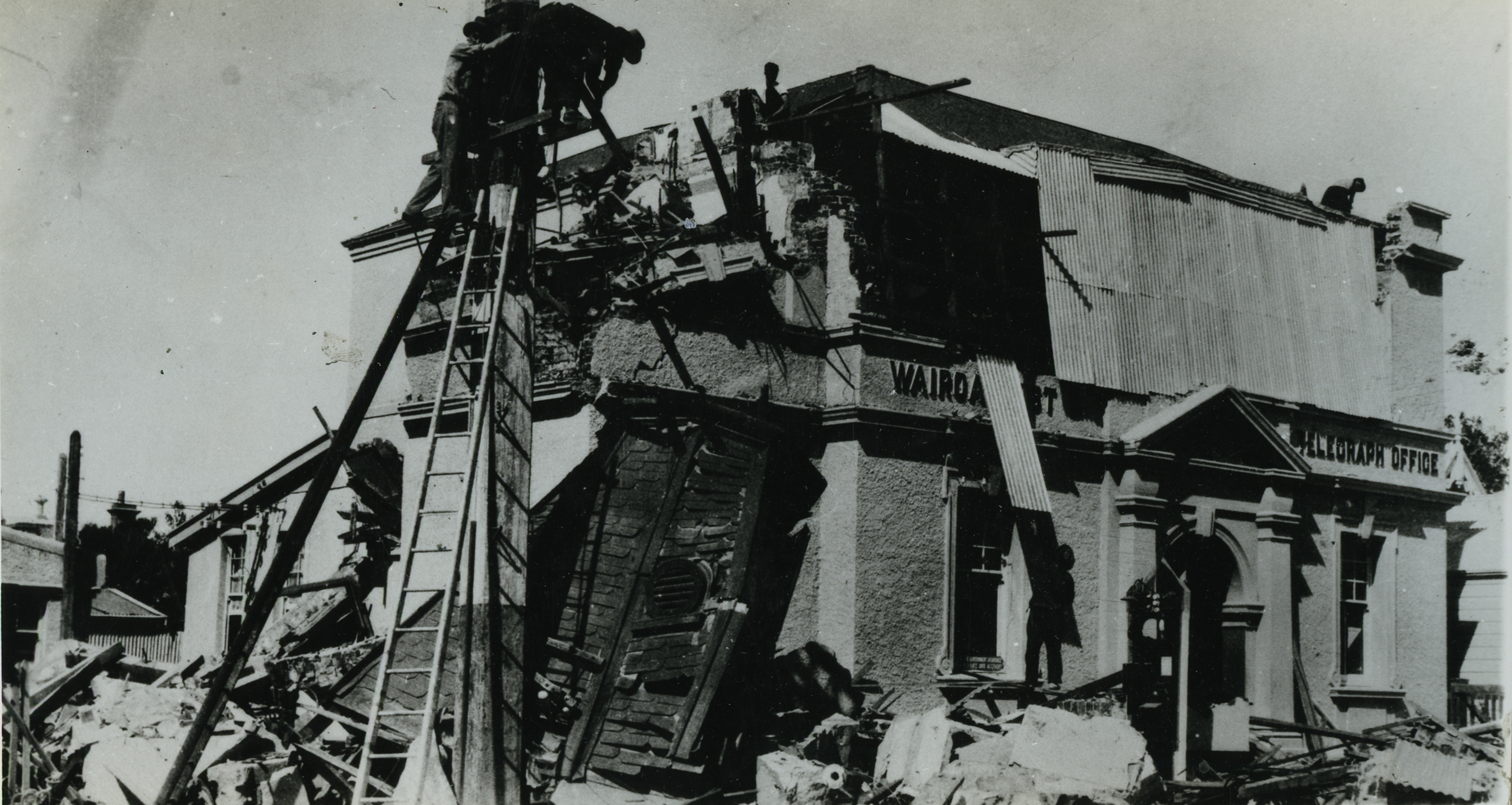
Wairoa Post Office destroyed by the 1931 Hawke's Bay earthquake

Date	Location	Region	Magnitude		Depth	Latitude	Longitude	Fatalities	Further information
Date	Location	Region	(M_{L})	(M_{W})	Depth	Latitude	Longitude	Fatalities	Further information
16 November 1901	Cheviot	North Canterbury	6.8		12 km	42.74°S	173.35°E	1	1901 Cheviot earthquake
9 August 1904	Cape Turnagain	Hawke's Bay	7.0	7.2	16 km	40.40°S	176.40°E	1	1904 Cape Turnagain earthquake
12 April 1913	Masterton	Wairarapa		5.6	12 km	41.00°S	175.7°E	1	Chimney damage in & around Masterton
7 October 1914	East Cape	Gisborne	6.6	6.6	12 km	37.80°S	178.20°E	1	1914 East Cape earthquakes
22 November 1914	Mayor Island	Bay of Plenty		7.3	300 km	37.50°S	176.50°E		Felt through North Island, chimney throughout Tairawhiti
1 May 1917	Raoul Island	Kermadec Islands		8.0	50 km	29.00°S	177.00°W		Felt throughout New Zealand
6 August 1917	Tinui	Wairarapa	6.8	6.8	12 km	40.80°S	176.00°E		Felt throughout North Island
3 November 1918	Puysegur Trench	South of New Zealand	6.8		50 km	47.00°S	165.40°E		Felt throughout Southland
29 June 1921	Kaweka Forest	Hawke's Bay	7.0	6.6	80 km	39.30°S	176.40°E		Felt throughout North Island
25 December 1922	Motunau	North Canterbury	6.4	6.4	< 25km	43°S	173.00°E		1922 Motunau earthquake
17 October 1926	Ahimanawa Range	Hawke's Bay		6.0	80 km	39.00°S	176.40°E		Felt through Eastern North Island
9 March 1929	Arthur's Pass	Canterbury	7.0	7.0	11 km	42.83°S	171.83°E		1929 Arthur's Pass earthquake
17 June 1929	Murchison	West Coast	7.3	7.7	9 km	41.69°S	172.20°E	17	1929 Murchison earthquake
23 June 1929	Murchison	West Coast	6.5	6.2	14 km	41.78°S	172.32°E		Felt throughout central New Zealand
12 February 1930	Porangahau	Hawke's Bay	6.2	6.2	33 km	40.39°S	176.55°E		Felt throughout lower half of the North Island
3 February 1931	North of Napier	Hawke's Bay	7.4	7.8	20 km	39.29°S	177.00°E	256	1931 Hawke's Bay earthquake
13 February 1931	East of Napier	Hawke's Bay	7.3	7.2	16 km	39.55°S	177.31°E		Aftershock to Mw 7.8 event
7 May 1931	Gisborne	Gisborne	6.0	6.1	12 km	38.76°S	177.66°E		Chimney damage in Gisborne region
22 September 1931	Raukumara Range	Bay of Plenty	6.0	6.2	80 km	37.81°S	177.93°E		Felt throughout North Island and upper South Island
5 March 1932	White Island	Bay of Plenty	6.0	6.0	30 km	36.50°S	178.00°E		Felt throughout upper North Island
16 September 1932	Wairoa	Hawke's Bay	6.9	6.8	8 km	38.95°S	177.59°E		Caused further damage to the already devastated Hawke's Bay
5 March 1934	Pahiatua	Manawatu	7.2	7.4	12 km	40.54°S	176.29°E	2	1934 Pahiatua earthquake
15 March 1934	Wairoa	Hawke's Bay	6.3	6.4	25 km	39.31°S	177.23°E		Felt strongly in Hawke's Bay and Gisborne
24 May 1936	Whakatāne	Bay of Plenty	6.5		150 km	37.99°S	177.00°E		Felt in North Island
17 December 1938	Charles Sound	Southland	7.0	7.1	47 km	44.99°S	167.00°E		Felt throughout South Island
11 February 1939	Fiordland	Southland	7.0		25 km	45.00°S	167.50°E		Felt throughout South Island
26 February 1940	Hastings	Hawke's Bay	6.0		25 km	39.50°S	176.50°E		Felt throughout North Island
24 June 1942	Masterton	Wairarapa	6.9	7.1	12 km	40.96°S	175.69°E	1	1942 Wairarapa earthquakes
1 August 1942	Masterton	Wairarapa	6.8	7.0	40 km	41.01°S	175.52°E		1942 Wairarapa earthquakes
2 December 1942	Masteron	Wairarapa	6.0	6.0	20 km	41.08°S	175.58°E		Felt throughout lower North Island
17 February 1943	Te Anau	Southland	6.2	6.4	36 km	45.29°S	168.00°E		Felt throughout South Island
8 May 1943	Wānaka	Otago	5.9		50 km	44.23°S	169.37°E		Felt throughout lower & central South Island
2 August 1943	Te Anau	Southland	6.1	6.6	33 km	45.77°S	166.79°E		Felt throughout South Island
2 September 1945	Puysegur Bank	Southland	6.5	7.0	12 km	47.47°S,	166.12°E		Felt throughout Southland and Otago
27 June 1946	Lake Coleridge	Canterbury	6.5	6.3	9 km	43.18°S	171.68°E		Felt throughout South Island
26 March 1947	Offshore Poverty Bay	Gisborne	5.9	7.1	15 km	38.85°S	178.80°E		1947 Gisborne earthquakes and tsunami
17 May 1947	Offshore Tolaga Bay	Gisborne	5.6	7.1	15 km	38.42°S	178.87°E		1947 Gisborne earthquakes and tsunami
28 August 1947	Offshore Mahia Peninsula	Gisborne	6.3	6.8	7 km	39.35°S	179.60°E		1947 Gisborne earthquakes and tsunami
13 October 1947	Jackson Bay	West Coast	6.2	6.2	18 km	44.42°S	168.48°E		Felt throughout southern & central South Island
23 May 1948	Waiau	North Canterbury	6.4	6.4	4 km	42.49°S	173.00°E		Felt throughout upper South Island; part of sequence
9 February 1949	Hāwera	Taranaki	6.4		199 km	39.67°S	174.35°E		Felt throughout North Island

== 1950–1999 ==
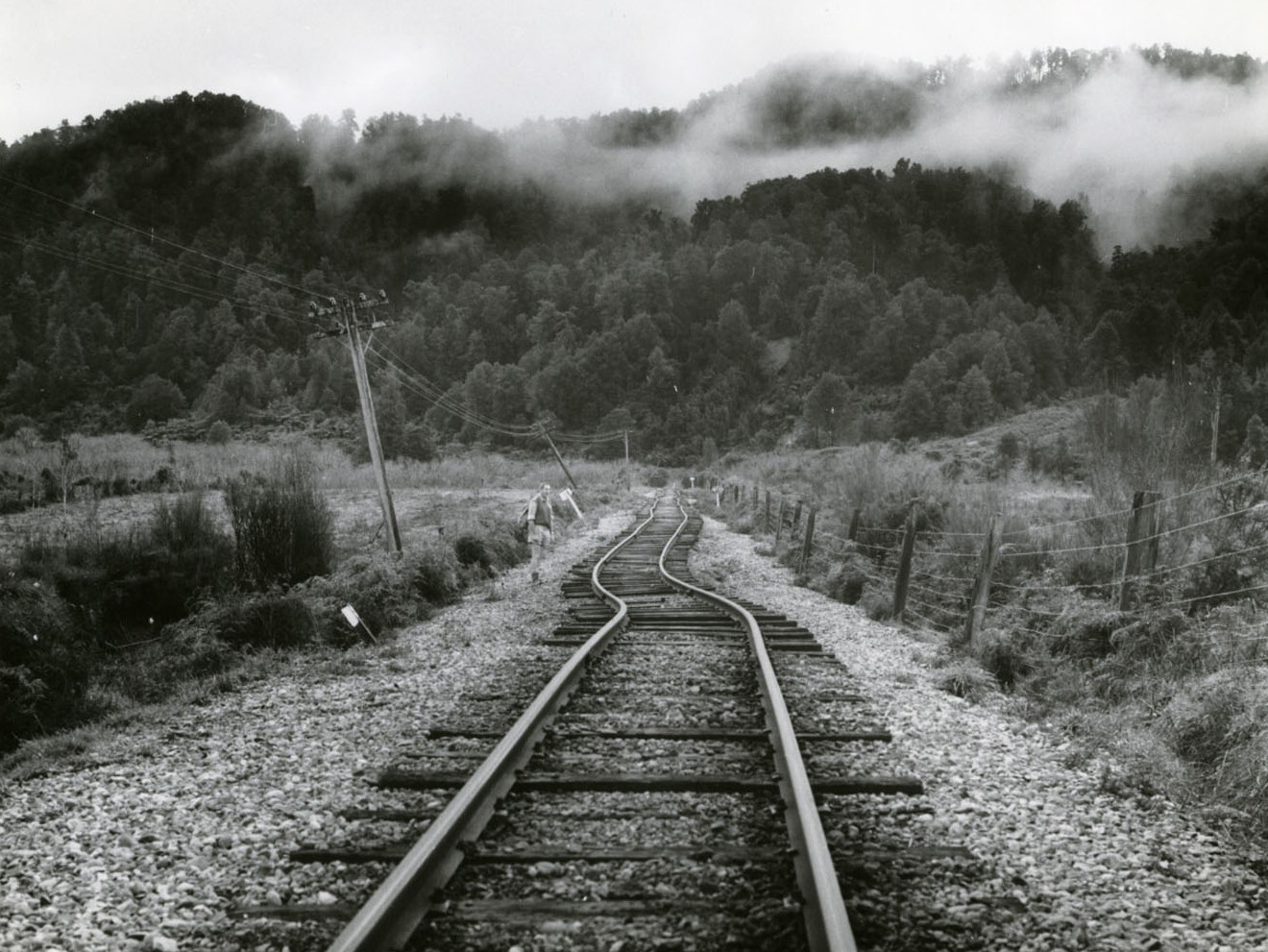
Railway line damage - 1968 Inangahua earthquake

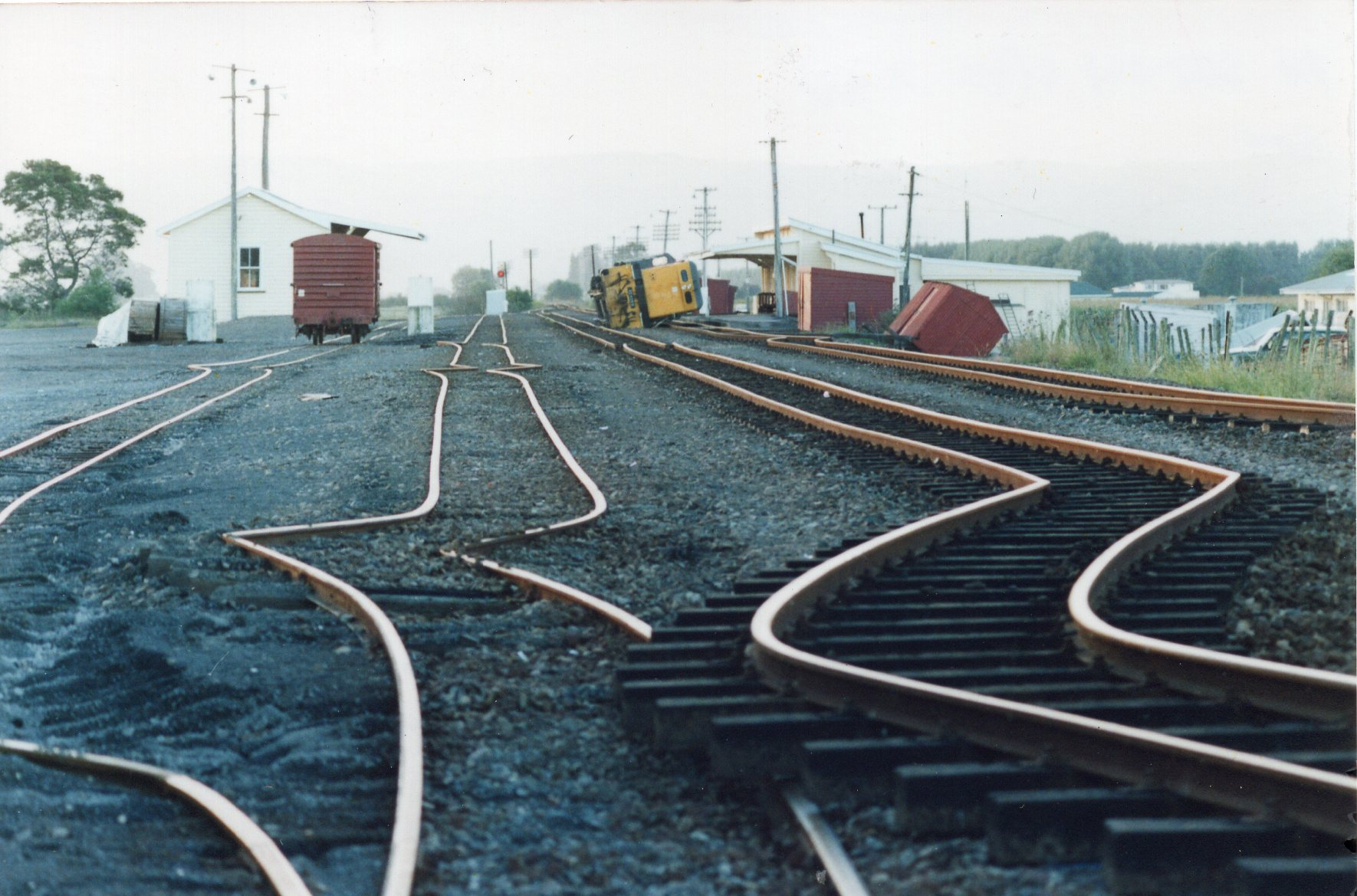
Damaged Railway Tracks after the 1987 Edgecumbe earthquake

Date	Location	Region	Magnitude		Depth	Latitude	Longitude	Fatalities	Further information
Date	Location	Region	(M_{L})	(M_{W})	Depth	Latitude	Longitude	Fatalities	Further information
11 January 1951	Cheviot	North Canterbury	5.5	5.9	12 km	42.79°S	173.18°E		Felt upper South Island, widespread damage in the Hurunui district
10 February 1951	Porangahau	Hawke's Bay	6.1	6.2	33 km	40.21°S	177.04°E		Felt throughout North Island
28 March 1951	White Island	Bay of Plenty	6.4		394 km	37.06°S	176.98°E		Felt throughout North Island
23 April 1951	Cape Runaway	Bay of Plenty	6.2	6.0	80 km	37.53°S	177.84°E		Felt throughout North Island
24 June 1951	Toaroa Junction	Manawatu	6.3	5.5	33 km	39.45°S	176.20°E		Felt throughout North Island
28 August 1952	Porangahau	Hawke's Bay	5.8	6.0	12 km	40.08°S	177.19°E		Felt in the East half of the North Island
29 September 1953	Tauranga	Bay of Plenty	7.2		273 km	37.59°S	176.48°E		Felt throughout North Island & upper South Island
27 February 1955	Raoul Island	Kermadec Islands	7.8		18 km	28.40°S	175.37°W		Felt in the East half of the North Island
30 January 1956	White Island	Bay of Plenty	5.9	6.4	12 km	37.10°S	177.42°E		Felt in Bay of Plenty, Waikato and Auckland
29 December 1956	Matawai	Gisborne	6.3	6.5	33 km	38.30°S	177.50°E		Felt strongly in Gisborne and eastern Bay of Plenty
31 January 1958	Ashley Clinton	Hawke's Bay	6.1	5.5	12 km	39.85°S	176.58°E		Felt throughout lower North Island, damaging in Hawke's Bay
10 December 1958	Mayor Island	Bay of Plenty	6.1		285 km	37.27°S	176.72°E		Felt throughout North Island and upper South Island
14 September 1959	Raoul Island	Kermadec Islands		7.8	35 km	28.82°S	177.07°W		Felt in the East half of the North Island
28 March 1960	Mokau	Taranaki	6.6		237 km	39.04°S	174.81°E		Doublet earthquake to 6.5 event
28 March 1960	Mokau	Taranaki	6.5		209 km	39.04°S	174.77°E		Doublet earthquake to 6.6 event
25 May 1960	Milford Sound	Southland	6.3	6.5	12 km	44.17°S	167.72°E		Felt throughout South Island
4 February 1961	Tauranga	Bay of Plenty	6.0		309 km	37.66°S	175.97°E		Felt in the East half of the North Island
27 December 1961	Martinborough	Wellington	6.2	6.5	12 km	41.51°S	176.11°E		Struck offshore, 65 km east of Martinborough
10 May 1962	Westport	West Coast	5.6	5.9	7 km	41.67°S	171.44°E		Widespread chimney damage in Westport
18 December 1963	Raoul Islands	Kermadec Islands		7.7	35 km	24.77°S	176.52°W		Felt in the East half of the North Island
23 December 1963	Peria	Northland	4.8	4.9	12 km	35.08°S	173.50°E		Largest known Northland earthquakes (doublet); localised chimney damage
11 April 1965	Kaikoura	North Canterbury	6.1		12 km	42.76°S	174.14°E		Felt in Kaikoura/North Canterbury
21 May 1965	George Sound	Southland	6.4		101 km	44.94°S	167.36°E		Felt throughout lower South Island
9 December 1965	Cape Runaway	Bay of Plenty	6.5	6.1	190 km	37.00°S	177.63°E		Felt in the East half of the North Island
4 March 1966	Gisborne	East Cape	6.0	5.6	33 km	38.73°S	178.11°E		Felt in Gisborne
23 April 1966	Cook Strait	Marlborough	5.8	5.8	12 km	41.64°S	174.54°E		Caused damage to railway lines and almost all chimneys in Seddon. Water mains, electrical and telephone lines failed.
24 May 1968	Inangahua Junction	West Coast	6.7	7.1	12 km	41.75°S	172.04°E	3	1968 Inangahua earthquake
25 September 1968	Solander Trough	Southland	5.9	6.3	12 km	46.53°S	166.57°E		Felt throughout Southland and Otago
9 January 1972	Te Aroha	Waikato	5.3	5.3	12 km	37.58°S	175.65°E		Localised chimney damage east of Hamilton
5 January 1973	Taumarunui	King Country	7.0	6.6	163 km	39.03°S	175.26°E		Felt throughout New Zealand
9 April 1974	Dunedin	Otago	4.9		12 km	45.97°S	170.52°E		1974 Dunedin earthquake: Widespread chimney damage in southern suburbs of Dunedin
5 November 1974	Opunake	Taranaki	6.0	5.4	12 km	39.54°S	173.46°E		Damage in Taranaki; felt throughout central New Zealand
5 May 1976	Milford Sound	Southland	6.6	6.5	12 km	44.67°S	167.38°E		Felt throughout lower South Island
15 January 1976	Raoul Island	Kermadec Islands		7.8	43 km	29.21°S	177.63°W		Foreshock to M 8.2 event
15 January 1976	Raoul Island	Kermadec Islands		8.2	31 km	29.17°S	177.31°W		Main shock
28 October 1976	Te Puke	Bay of Plenty	4.9		12 km	37.83°S	176.34°E		Damaging shock in a swarm lasting from August to December 1976
18 January 1977	Cook Strait	Marlborough	6.0	6.0	33 km	41.84°S	174.58°E		Damaging in Wellington; felt throughout central New Zealand
12 October 1979	Puysegur Trench	South of New Zealand	6.5	7.3	12 km	46.70°S	166.03°E		Felt throughout lower South Island
8 March 1984	Matawai	Bay of Plenty	6.4	5.9	75 km	38.20°S	177.44°E		Felt throughout North Island
25 June 1984	Macauley River	Canterbury	5.9	6.1	12 km	43.59°S	170.63°E		Felt throughout central South Island
31 December 1984	White Island	Bay of Plenty	6.3		12 km	36.59°S	177.55°E		Felt around the Bay of Plenty
26 September 1985	Kermadec Trench	Kermadec Islands	7.0	6.9	33 km	34.64°S	178.02°W		Felt in East half of North Island
21 October 1986	Raoul Island	Kermadec Islands		7.7	29 km	28.12°S	176.37°W		
2 March 1987	Edgecumbe	Bay of Plenty	6.1	6.5	10 km	37.88°S	176.80°E	1	1987 Edgecumbe earthquake
9 March 1987	Pegasus Bay	Canterbury	5.2		30 km	43.22°S	173.20°E		Damaging in Christchurch
4 June 1988	Te Anau	Southland	6.1	6.7	73 km	45.12°S	167.29°E		Damaging in Te Anau & Queenstown; felt throughout South Island
24 May 1989	Puysegur Trench	South of New Zealand		8.2					Felt in the South Island
31 May 1989	Doubtful Sound	Southland	6.1	6.4	23 km	45.33°S	166.87°E		Felt in lower South Island
10 February 1990	Lake Tennyson	North Canterbury	5.8	5.9	8 km	42.25°S	172.65°E		Felt in upper South Island; widespread landsliding
19 February 1990	Weber	Manawatu	5.9	6.2	23 km	40.47°S	176.44°E		Foreshock to M6.4 event
13 May 1990	Weber	Manawatu	6.2	6.4	11 km	40.43°S	176.47°E		Mainshock
28 January 1991	Buller Ranges	West Coast	6.1	5.8	10 km	41.90°S	171.65°E		Foreshock to M 6.3 event
29 January 1991	Buller Ranges	West Coast	6.3	6.0	17.3 km	41.90°S	171.72°E		Mainshock
9 September 1991	South Taranaki Bight	Manawatu	6.3	5.6	86 km	40.24°S	175.16°E		Felt throughout North Island
27 May 1992	Wairau Valley	Marlborough	6.8	5.9	79 km	41.60°S	173.66°E		Felt in Central New Zealand
21 June 1992	White Island	Bay of Plenty	6.1	6.3	5 km	37.57°S	176.82°E		Felt in Bay of Plenty
11 April 1993	Tikokino	Hawke's Bay	6.1	6.0	25 km	39.73°S	176.71°E		Felt strongly throughout Hawke's Bay
10 August 1993	Secretary Island	Southland	6.7	6.8	22 km	45.21°S	166.70°E		Felt as far away as Australia
10 August 1993	Ormond	East Cape	6.3	6.2	39 km	38.53°S	177.91°E		Felt strongly in Gisborne.
18 June 1994	Arthur's Pass	Canterbury	6.7	6.7	4 km	43.00°S	171.47°E		Reverse slip mainshock
19 June 1994	Lake Coleridge	Canterbury	6.1		5 km	43.16°S	171.47°E		Triggered from the M 6.7 Arthur's Pass event
6 February 1995	Offshore East Cape	Gisborne	7.0	7.5	15 km	37.65°S	179.49°E		Felt in East half of North Island
10 February 1995	NE of New Zealand	East Cape	6.6		12 km	37.92°7S	179.51°E		
24 November 1995	Arthur's Pass	Canterbury	6.3		7 km	42.95°S	171.81°E		Felt strongly in the South Island
25 May 1997	Raoul Island	Kermadec Islands		7.9	339 km	33.61°S	177.80°E		Felt throughout North Island and upper half of the South Island
20 April 1998	Taumarunui	King Country	6.7		232 km	39.02°S	174.92°E		Felt throughout the North Island
26 October 1999	Taupō	Waikato		6.2	160 km	38.56°S	175.91°E		Felt throughout New Zealand

== 2000–2009 ==
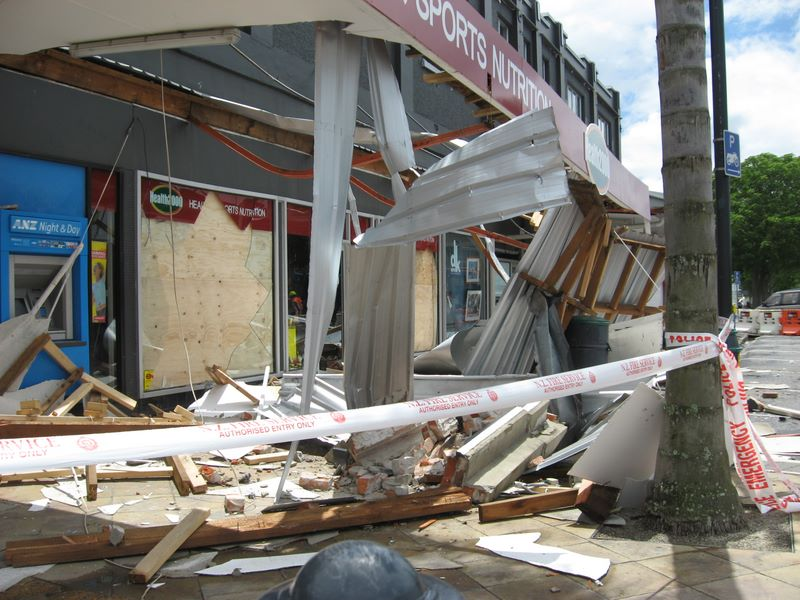
Damage outside Health 2000 Main Street from the 2007 Gisborne earthquake

Date	Location	Region	Magnitude		Depth	Latitude	Longitude	Fatalities	Further information
Date	Location	Region	(M_{L})	(M_{W})	Depth	Latitude	Longitude	Fatalities	Further information
15 August 2000	L'Esperance Rock	Kermadec Islands	7.6		436 km	31.94°S	178.55°E		Felt in Christchurch
1 November 2000	Fiordland	Southland	6.2		9 km	45.12°S	166.95°E		
21 August 2001	NE of New Zealand	East Cape	7.1	7.1	33 km	36.98°S	179.16°E		Felt in the Gisborne area
21 October 2001	NE of New Zealand	East Cape	6.3		12 km	36.89°S	179.86°E		Felt in the Gisborne area
8 December 2001	Haast	West Coast	6.2		5 km	44.11°S	168.60°E		Mainshock
22 August 2003	Fiordland	Southland	7.0	7.2	24 km	45.19°S,	166.83°E		2003 Fiordland earthquake
18 July 2004	Lake Rotomā	Bay of Plenty	5.1	5.4	5 km	38.01°S,	176.51°E	1	Part of a swarm of earthquakes in the area
22 November 2004	Puysegur Trench	South of New Zealand	7.1	7.0	12 km	46.57°S	165.08°E		Reportedly felt as far north as Hamilton
24 December 2004	Macquarie Ridge	South of New Zealand		8.1	35 km	49.31°S	161.35°E		2004 Tasman Sea earthquake
14 March 2005	W of New Zealand	Btw. Taranaki & Tasman	6.4		154 km	40.17°S	173.63°E		Felt strongly throughout central New Zealand
16 May 2006	L'Esperance Rock	Kermadec Islands	7.5	7.4	150 km	31.56°S,	179.30°W		Felt in East half of New Zealand
16 May 2006	Raoul Island	Kermadec Islands	7.1		33 km	31.98°S,	177.21°W		Felt in East half on North Island
16 October 2007	Fiordland	Southland	6.7	6.7	5 km	44.72°S	167.39°E		Felt lower half of the South Island
9 December 2007	Raoul Island	Kermadec Islands		7.8	152 km	25.99°S	177.51°W		Felt in East half of New Zealand
20 December 2007	Gisborne	East Cape	6.7	6.6	44 km	38.89°S	178.44°E	1	2007 Gisborne earthquake
25 August 2008	Hastings	Hawke's Bay	5.9	5.5	32 km	−39.72°S	176.85°E		Slight damage in Napier and Hastings
15 July 2009	Puysegur Trench	South of New Zealand	6.1		33 km	46.07°S	165.75°E		Felt throughout Southland and Otago
15 July 2009	Dusky Sound	Southland		7.8	12 km	45.76°S	166.58°E		2009 Dusky Sound earthquake

== 2010–2019 ==
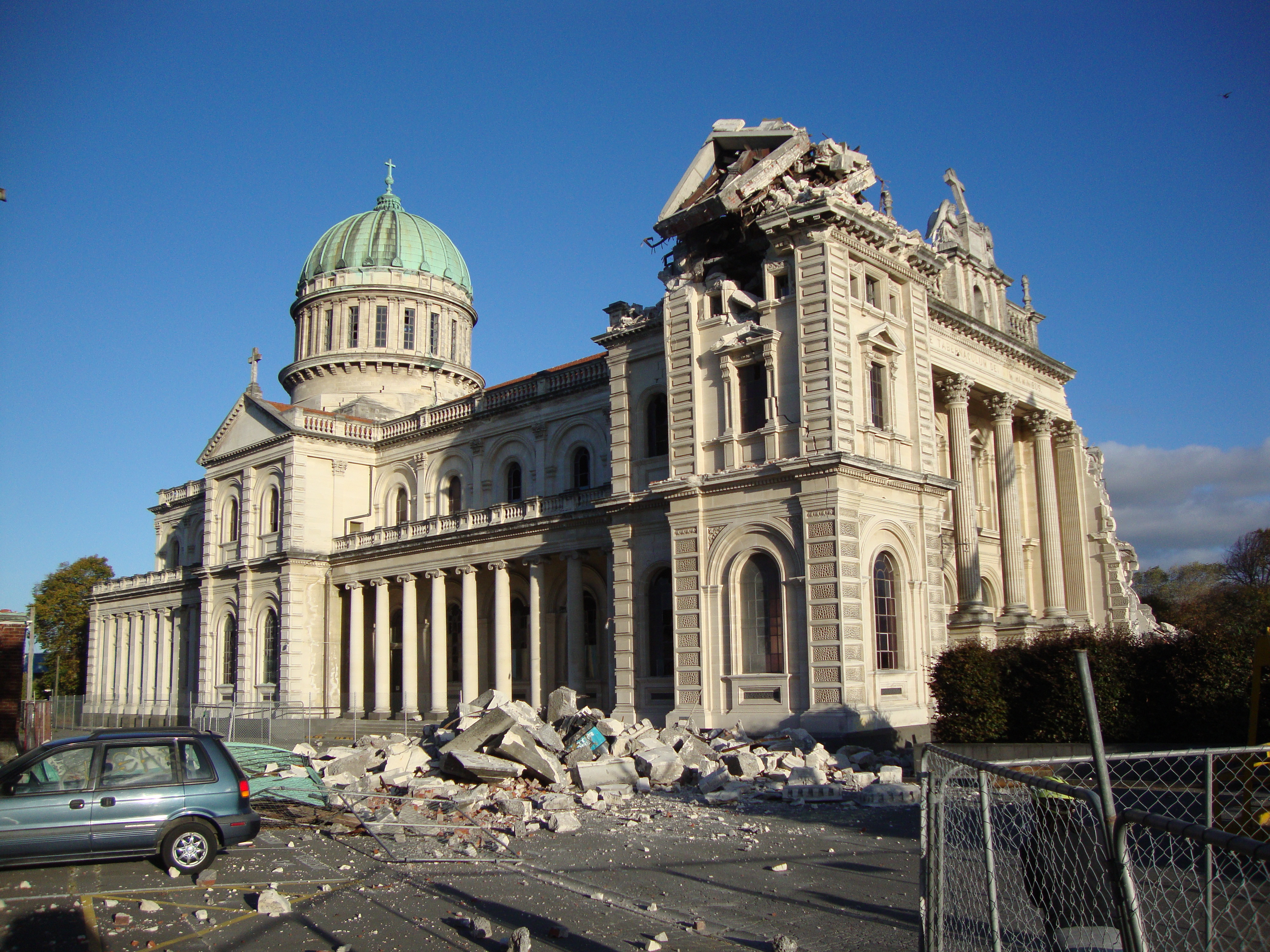
The Cathedral of the Blessed Sacrament after 2011 Christchurch earthquake

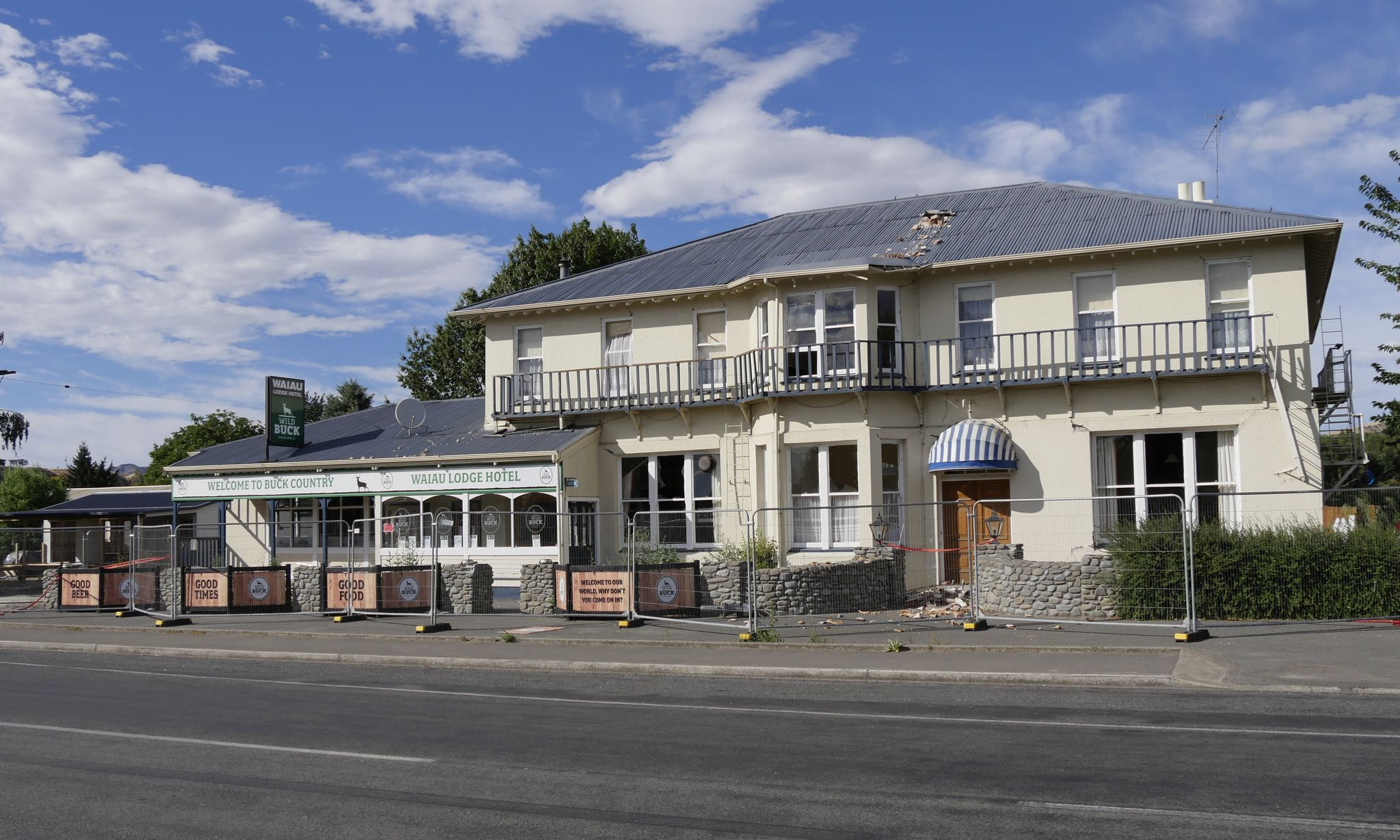
Waiau Lodge Hotel after 2016 Kaikōura earthquake

Date	Location	Region	Magnitude			Depth	Latitude	Longitude	Fatalities	Further information
Date	Location	Region	(M_{L})	(M_{W})	(M_{b})	Depth	Latitude	Longitude	Fatalities	Further information
4 September 2010	Darfield	Canterbury	7.1	7.0	6.4	11 km	43.52°S	172.16°E	2	2010 Canterbury earthquake
26 December 2010	Christchurch	Canterbury	4.9	4.7		5 km	43.55°S	172.63°E		December 2010 Christchurch earthquake
22 February 2011	Christchurch	Canterbury	6.3	6.1	6.1	6 km	43.58S	172.67E	185	2011 Christchurch earthquake
13 June 2011	Christchurch	Canterbury	6.4	5.9	6.0	7 km	43.56°S	172.73°E	1	June 2011 Christchurch earthquake
5 July 2011	Taupō	Waikato	6.5	5.5	5.4	153 km	38.65°S	175.70°E		Felt throughout New Zealand
7 July 2011	Raoul Island	Kermadec Islands	7.6	7.6	7.0	20 km	29.31°S	176.20°W		Felt as far away as Christchurch
22 October 2011	Raoul Island	Kermadec Islands	7.3	7.4	6.5	33 km	28.99°S	176.18°W		Felt in eastern half of the North Island
23 December 2011	Christchurch	Canterbury	6.0	5.9	5.7	7 km	43.52°S	172.74°E	1	December 2011 Christchurch earthquakes
3 July 2012	S of Ōpunake	Taranaki		6.2		241 km	40.05°S	173.76°E		
21 July 2013	Cook Strait	Marlborough	6.5	6.5	6.1	17 km	41.61°S	174.33°E		2013 Seddon earthquake
16 August 2013	Lake Grassmere	Marlborough	6.6	6.5	6.0	8 km	41.73°S	174.15°E		2013 Lake Grassmere earthquake
16 August 2013	Lake Grassmere	Marlborough	6.0	5.9	5.8	8 km	41.67°S	174.26°E		Largest aftershock to 2013 Lake Grassmere earthquake
20 January 2014	Eketāhuna	Wairarapa	6.2	6.1	5.8	34 km	40.62°S	175.85°E		2014 Eketāhuna earthquake
13 October 2014	Fiordland	Southland	6.2	5.8	5.4	9 km	46.29°S	165.87°E		
14 October 2014	NE of Whakatāne	Bay of Plenty	6.8	6.5	6.4	82 km	34.90°S	179.65°E		
17 November 2014	NE of Gisborne	Gisborne	6.5	6.7	6.2	22 km	37.68°S	179.68°E	1	Felt strongly across the North Island
6 January 2015	W of Arthur's Pass	Canterbury	6.0	5.6	5.5	5 km	43.06°S	171.25°E		Felt throughout the South Island
24 April 2015	SE of St Arnaud	Marlborough	6.2	6.1	6.0	52 km	42.09°S	173.07°E		Felt throughout New Zealand
4 May 2015	W of Wānaka	Otago	6.2	5.8	6.1	4 km	44.54°S	168.84°E		Felt throughout lower South Island
2 February 2016	E of Macauley Island	Kermadec Islands	6.6	6.2	6.3	366 km	31.65°S	177.74°E		Felt widely in the North Island
14 February 2016	Christchurch	Canterbury	5.7	5.8		15 km	43.5°S	172.83°E		2016 Christchurch earthquake
2 September 2016	NE of East Cape	East Cape	7.1	7.1		55 km	37.01°S	179.63°E		2016 Te Araroa earthquake
14 November 2016	Culverden	North Canterbury	7.8	7.8		15 km	42.757°S	173.077°E	2	2016 Kaikōura earthquake
30 October 2018	SW of Taumarunui	Manawatū-Whanganui	6.5		6.2	207 km	39.03°S	175.01°E		Felt widely in the North Island

== 2020–present ==
Date	Location	Region	Magnitude			Depth	Latitude	Longitude	Fatalities	Further information
Date	Location	Region	(M_{L})	(M_{W})	(M_{b})	Depth	Latitude	Longitude	Fatalities	Further information
19 June 2020	SE of L'Esperance Rock	Kermadec Islands	7.4	7.3	7.3	10 km	33.46°S	177.44°W		
5 March 2021	East of East Cape	Gisborne	7.0	7.1	7.1	90 km	37.42°S	179.54°W		Felt throughout New Zealand
5 March 2021	S of Raoul Island	Kermadec Islands		7.4		56 km	29.61°S	177.84°W		
5 March 2021	S of Raoul Island	Kermadec Islands		8.1		19 km	29.74°S	177.28°W		2021 Kermadec Islands earthquake
6 March 2021	NE of Gisborne	Gisborne		6.3		13 km	37.605°S	179.598°E		
20 June 2021	S of Raoul Island	Kermadec Islands		6.5	6.4	25 km	30.216°S	177.845°W		Aftershock of the 2021 Kermadec Islands earthquake
2 March 2022	S of Raoul Island	Kermadec Islands		6.6	6.5	24 km	30.076°S	177.728°W		
15 February 2023	NW of Paraparaumu	Wellington	6.1	6.0	6.3	50 km	40.56°S	174.56°W		
24 April 2023	Kermadec Islands			7.1						
20 September 2023	45 km north of Geraldine	Canterbury	5.7	6.0	6.3	10 km	43.70°S	171.08°E		
25 March 2025	155 km north-west of Snares Islands	Southland		6.8		12 km	46.77°S	165.68°W		
7 July 2025	208 km west-southwest of Riverton	Southland		6.3		10 km	47.217°S	165.595°E		

== See also ==
- Canterbury Earthquake Response and Recovery Act 2010
- Geology of New Zealand
- List of disasters in New Zealand by death toll
- List of tsunamis affecting New Zealand
- Natural Hazards Commission
- Shaky Isles – a nickname for New Zealand
- Volcanism of New Zealand
