= Waiau Lodge Hotel =

Former hotel in Waiau, Canterbury, New Zealand

Coordinates: 42.6563°S 173.0405°E

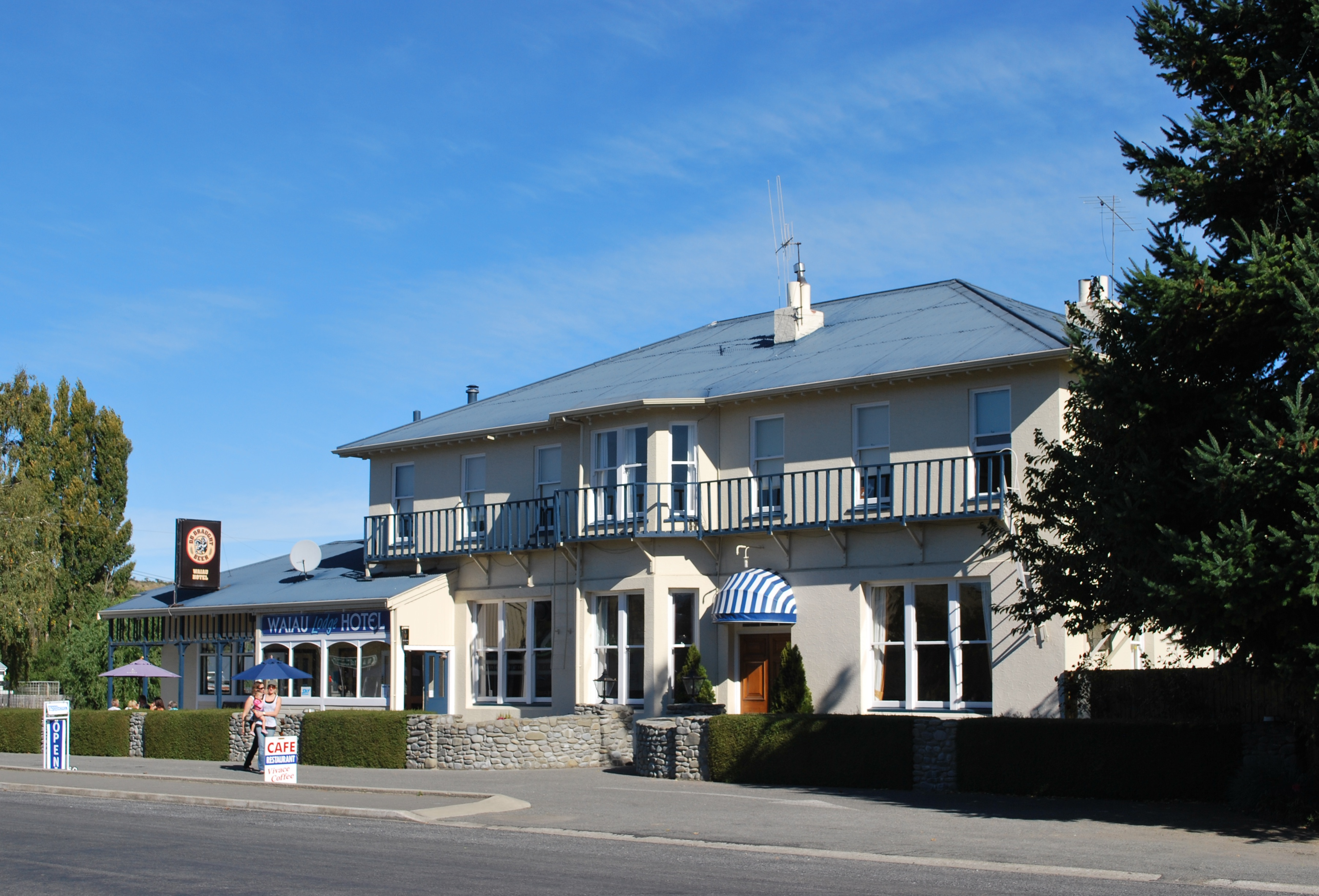
Waiau Lodge Hotel in 2010

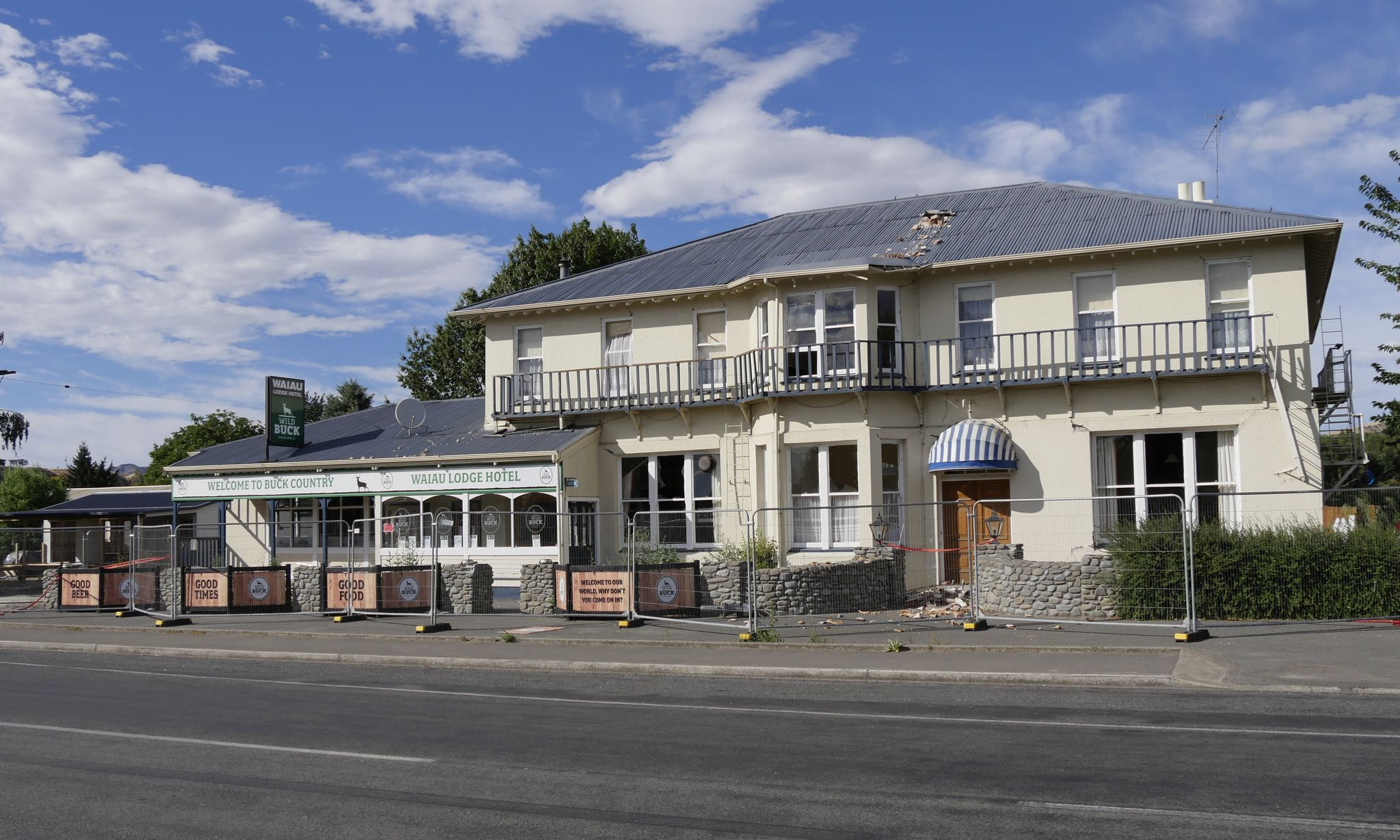
The hotel in February 2017. It has been cordoned off and the chimney is gone.

The Waiau Lodge Hotel was a hotel and pub in Waiau, Canterbury, New Zealand. Known as the "Grand Lady", the hotel was built in 1910 and its first publican was Frederick O'Malley until he sold the pub in 1913. After 21 further owners, it was bought in 2015 by friends Michelle Beri and Lindsay Collins. They lived in the hotel and it had eight guest rooms.

The November 2016 Kaikōura earthquake badly damaged the building, with the three chimneys falling through the roof and damaging the interior. Bricks, bar stock and bits of plaster from the ceiling and walls were brought to the ground. The damage caused the hotel to be red-stickered and cordoned off due to safety concerns. An engineer's report later concluded that the building could be repaired. Beri applied $210,000 from the Future Kaikoura Business Recovery Grant, which was a grant made to assist businesses affected by the earthquake, for the costs of the temporary bar but it was declined. In May 2017 the hotel's pub re-opened in a temporary building in the carpark, which was opened by Mayor of Hurunui Winton Dalley by cutting a red ribbon. Each year the Waiau Lodge Plains Motorcycle Club of Christchurch hosts a motorcycle rally. The one in January 2017 raised $15,000 for the earthquake recovery in Waiau.

The hotel burnt down on 22 May 2021 and investigators at the time said that they were treating the fire as possible arson. Beri has said that she does not plan on rebuilding the hotel.
