= 2007 Gisborne earthquake =

Earthquake in New Zealand

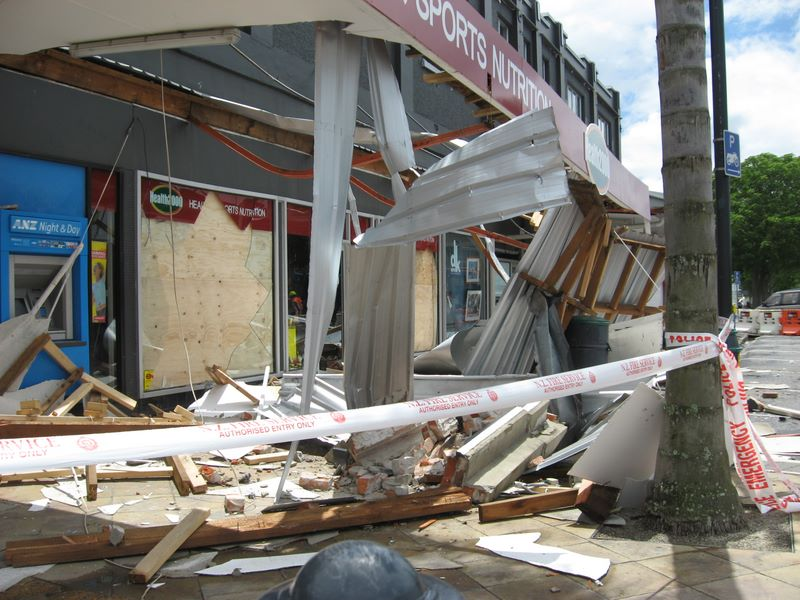
- Damage outside Health 2000 Main Street

- Location within New Zealand
- UTC time: 2007-12-20 07:55:15
- ISC event: 13293317
- USGS-ANSS: ComCat
- Local date: 20 December 2007
- Local time: 8:55 pm NZDT (UTC+13)
- Magnitude: 6.7 M_{w}
- Depth: 33 km (21 mi)
- Epicentre: 38.89°S 178.54°E
- Areas affected: New Zealand
- Max. intensity: MMI VII (Very strong)
- Peak acceleration: 0.28 g
- Casualties: 1 dead, 11 injured

The 2007 Gisborne earthquake occurred under the Pacific Ocean about 50 kilometres (31 mi) off the eastern coast of New Zealand's North Island at 8:55 pm NZDT on 20 December. With a moment magnitude of 6.7 and maximum Mercalli intensity of VII (Very Strong), the tremor affected the city of Gisborne and was felt widely throughout the country, from Auckland in the north to Dunedin in the south.

== Tectonic setting ==
New Zealand lies along the boundary between the Indo-Australian plate and Pacific plate.

- In the South Island, most of the relative displacement between these plates is taken up along a single dextral (right lateral) strike-slip fault with a major reverse component, the Alpine Fault.
- In the North Island, displacement is mainly taken up along the Kermadec-Tonga subduction zone, although the remaining dextral strike-slip component is accommodated by the North Island Fault System. Subduction off the coast takes place at the Hikurangi Trough, which runs parallel to the East Coast of the North Island and is the southern extension from the Kermadec Trench, however earthquakes here occur less frequently.

== Earthquake ==
The earthquake occurred at 8:55 pm on 20 December 2007 off the coast of Gisborne, at a depth of about 40 kilometres. Shaking mostly affected Gisborne, but was felt throughout the country, from Auckland to Dunedin. Small appliances or furniture slipped or fell as far south as Wellington.

== Effects ==
While the earthquake was initially reported to have caused no deaths, an elderly woman in Gisborne suffered a heart attack and died shortly after the quake. A number of buildings in central Gisborne were damaged and had their roofs cave in. The central business district was closed off to allow building inspectors to assess buildings for damage; three buildings had collapsed. Gisborne's standby sewage system was activated. There were power outages immediately after the earthquake hit. Temporary problems with phone, water and gas lines also occurred. The town clock stopped at 8:55 pm. The Earthquake Commission had received over 6,200 insurance claims costing a total of about $25 million, the biggest number since the 1987 Edgecumbe earthquake. It was earlier estimated that the cost of damage caused by the earthquake could rise to $30 million.

The National Crisis Management Centre was activated after the earthquake struck. A state of emergency started on 21 December and lasted until 22 December.

Liquefaction occurred near the Waipaoa River, and there was an increased activity in nearby mud volcanoes.

== See also ==
- List of earthquakes in 2007
- List of earthquakes in New Zealand
