= 1869 Christchurch earthquake =

Earthquake in New Zealand

- Location within New Zealand
- Local date: 5 June 1869
- Local time: 8:00 a.m.
- Magnitude: 6.0 M_{L} 4.7 M_{w}
- Epicentre: 44°S 173°E
- Areas affected: South Island New Zealand
- Max. intensity: MMI VII (Very strong) – MMI VIII (Severe)
- Casualties: None

The 1869 Christchurch earthquake occurred at 8:00 am on 5 June, near New Brighton, with an estimated Richter magnitude of 6.0. The shock had a Mercalli Intensity of VII–VIII.

The shock damaged several brick and stone buildings in the city, destroying chimneys and damaging the spire of St John's church in Hereford Street.

The effects of the earthquake on stone buildings such as St. Johns prompted the Church of St Michael and All Angels to be built using timber.

== See also ==
- 2010 Canterbury earthquake
- 2011 Christchurch earthquake
- 2016 Kaikōura earthquake
- List of earthquakes in New Zealand
- List of historical earthquakes
- List of tsunamis affecting New Zealand
