= Mike Harding (New Zealand folk musician) =

New Zealand musician

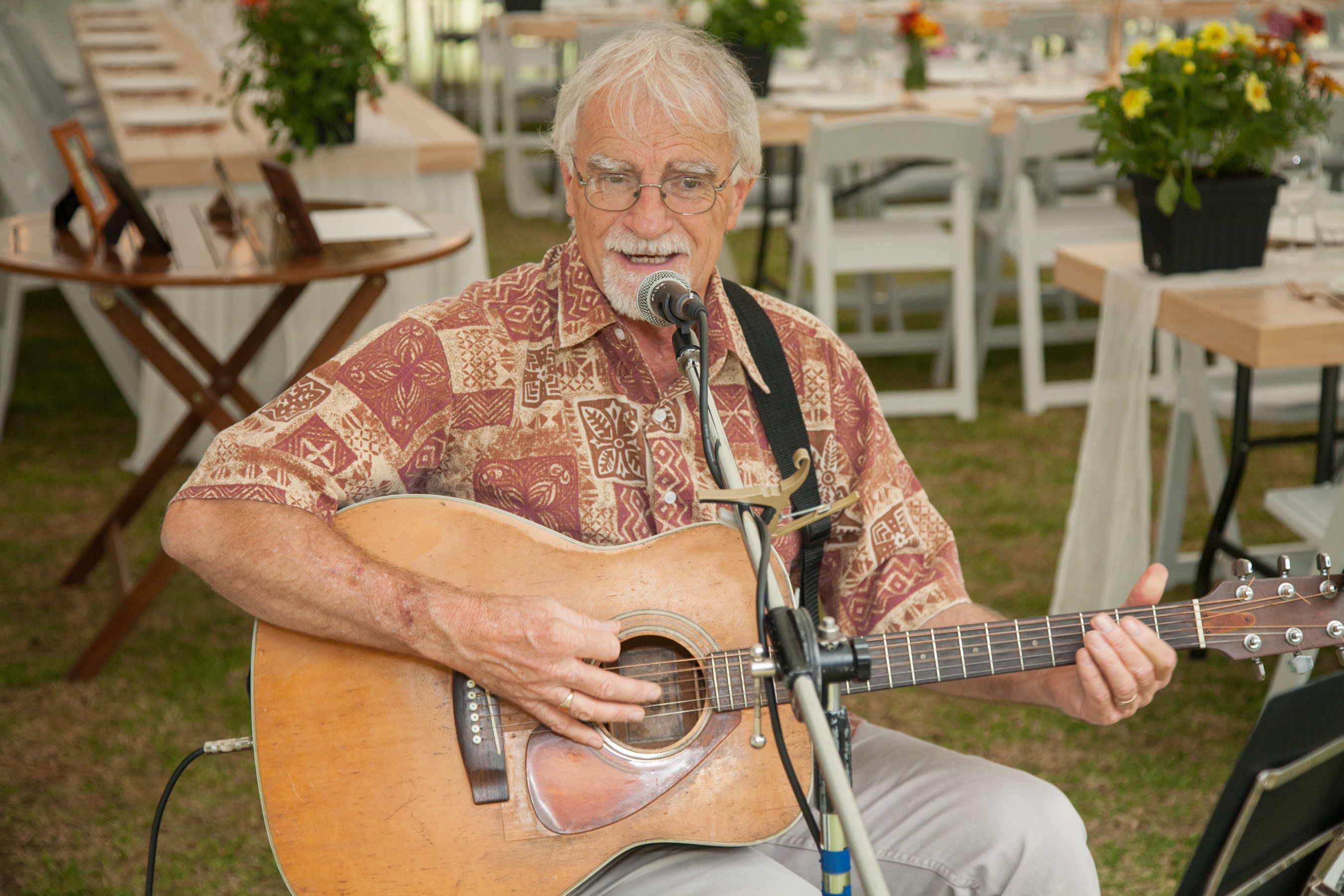
Mike Harding at a wedding performance in 2018.

Mike Harding is a New Zealand folk musician born on 16 July 1952, now living in New Plymouth, Taranaki.

== Biography ==
=== Musician ===
Growing up in Eketāhuna, Harding practised his music in "the streets, markets and clubs of Auckland in the early 1980s", before he describes himself as having spent a "Time on the Road" decade all over New Zealand and parts of Australia and Britain. In 1998 he created his tenth recording, "Past to the Present", described by Radio New Zealand as a "20 track exploration of NZ from north to south, its people and places, past and present." and his first record available on CD. In 2008, he followed it by "Here We Have a Land", with a selection of New Zealand folk songs and his own original creations.

Mike Harding has played at the Auckland Folk Festival several times, especially in the 1990s, was a top performer at the Marlborough Folk Society's concerts in Blenheim, as well as playing at other music festivals like New Plymouth's "TSB Bank Festival of Lights". Since about 1995, Mike Harding also plays on and off as guitarist of the Gumboot Tango band, appearing regularly at events like the Taranaki International Arts Festival.

=== Music historian ===
In 1992 he also wrote "When the Pakeha Sings of Home", a source guide to the folk and popular songs of European New Zealanders, described as important in raising the profile of a little-studied part of New Zealand popular music history.
