= 1901 Cheviot earthquake =

Earthquake in New Zealand

Coordinates: 42.81°S 173.26°E

- Location within New Zealand
- UTC time: 1901-11-15 20:15
- ISC event
- USGS-ANSS: n/a
- Local date: 16 November 1901
- Local time: 07:47 NZT
- Magnitude: 6.9
- Depth: 33 km (21 mi)
- Areas affected: South Island, New Zealand
- Casualties: 1 death

The 1901 Cheviot earthquake occurred at 07:47 NZT on 16 November 1901 (20:15 15 November UTC) with an estimated magnitude of 6.9, centred near the township of Cheviot in the Canterbury region of New Zealand.

== Damage and casualties ==
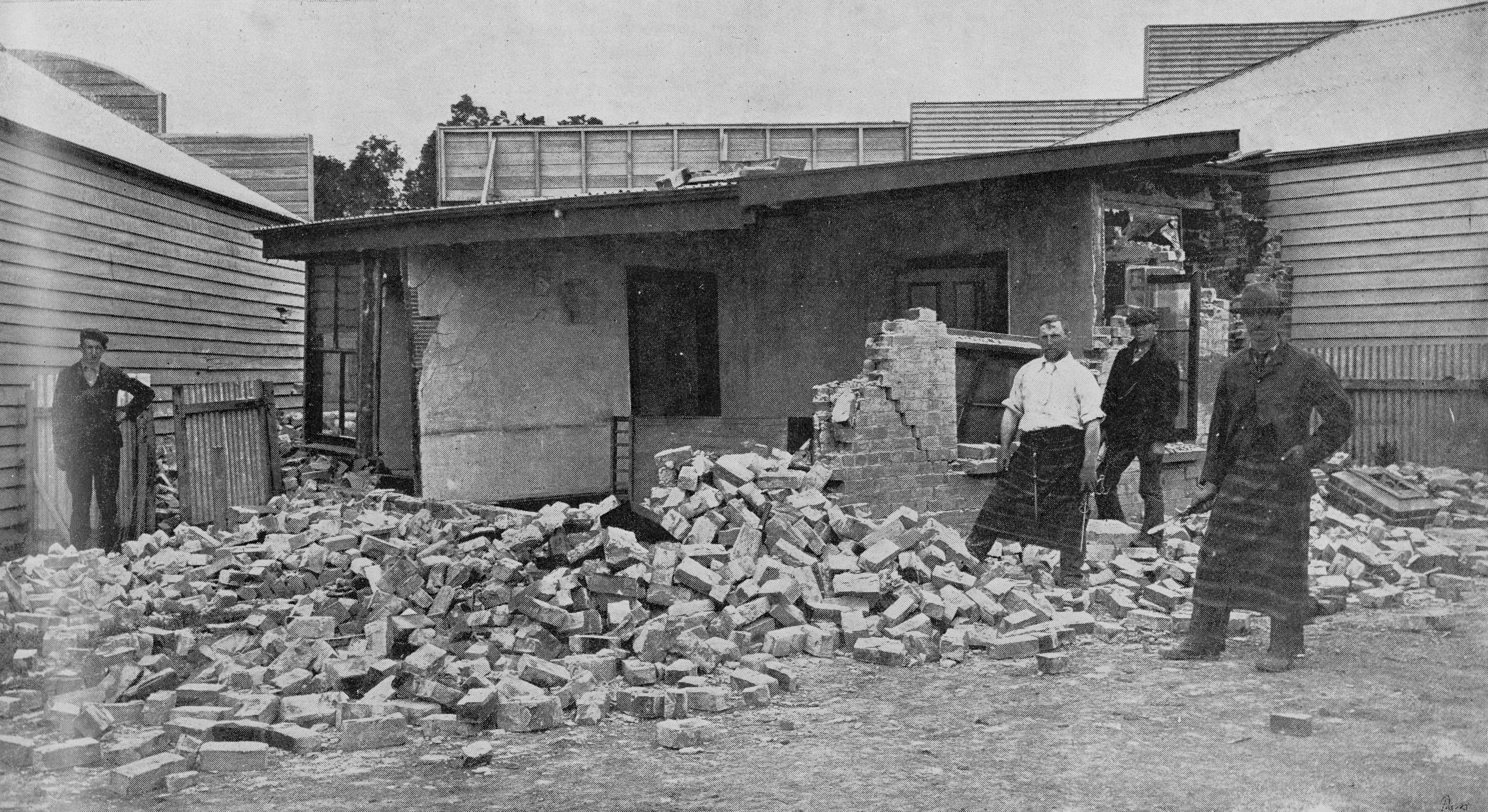
McTaggart's butcher shop in Cheviot after the earthquake

A baby was killed when a sod hut collapsed. Other casualties in the Canterbury region are not known.

The top of ChristChurch Cathedral's spire fell, as had occurred in the 1888 North Canterbury earthquake. Its stone structure was subsequently replaced with a more resilient design.

Observations of sand blows (sand volcano) and lateral spreading, consistent with soil liquefaction phenomena in the township of Kaiapoi were reported in local newspapers in a two to three block area at the eastern end of Charles and Sewell Streets on the north bank of the Kaiapoi River, in addition to similar effects observed on the opposing river bank, and the road to Belfast.

== Gallery ==
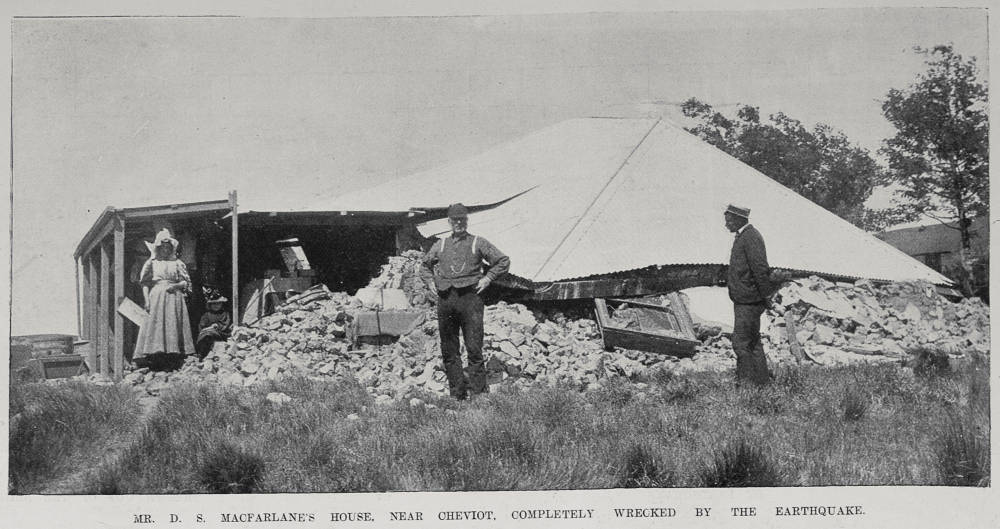
Damage to a house

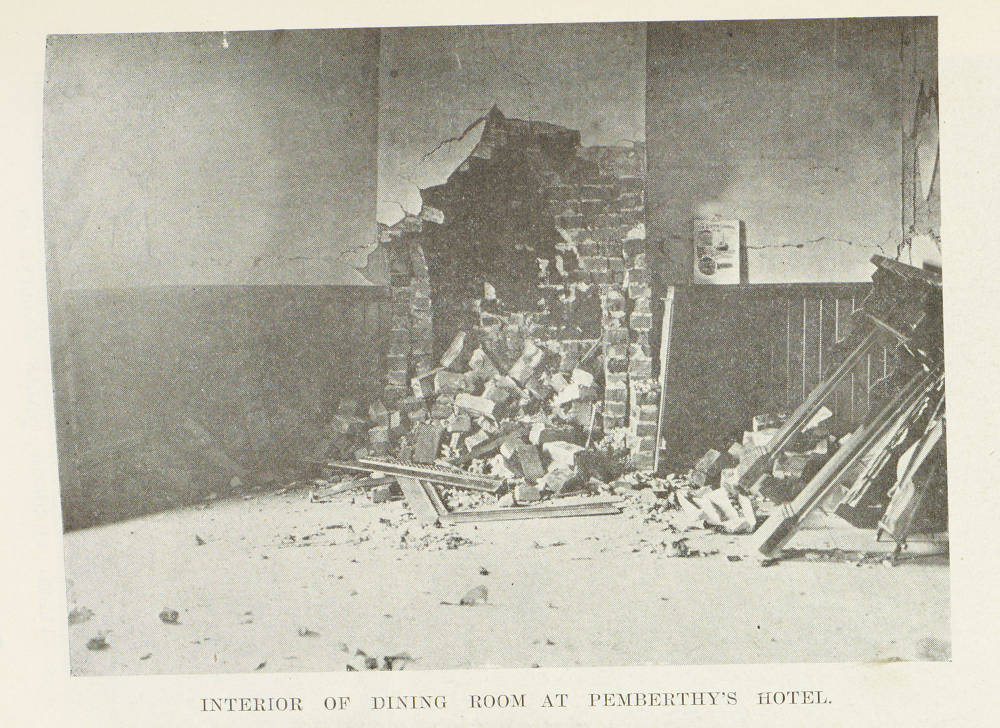
Interior damage

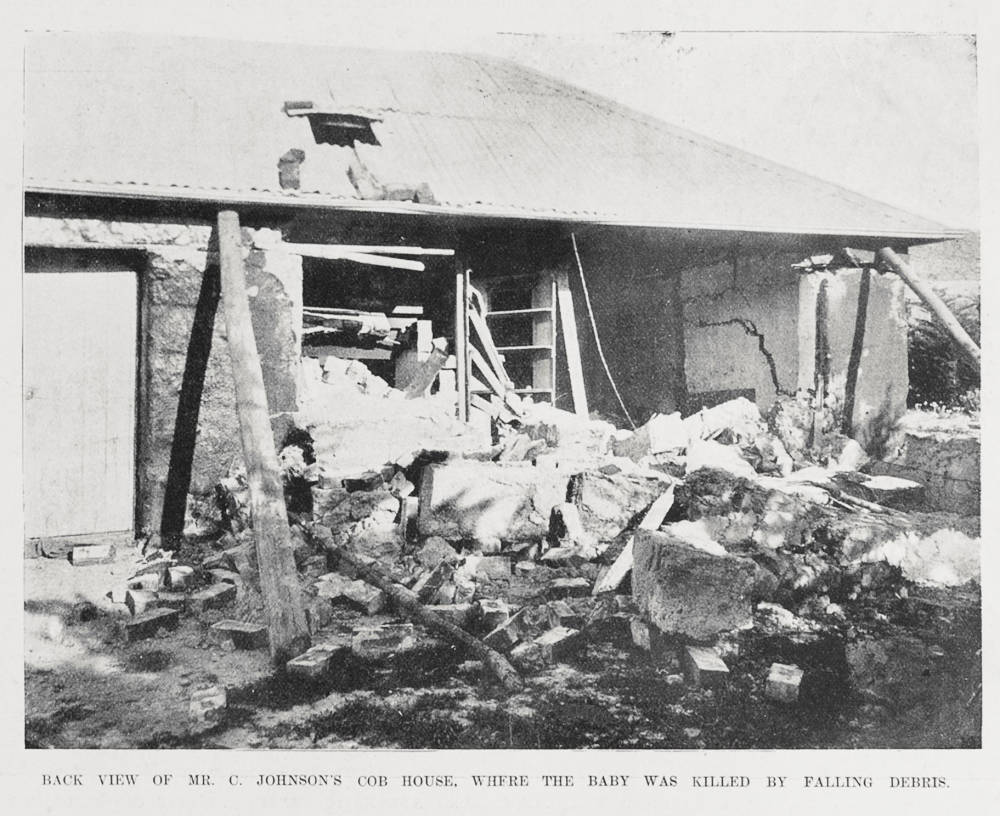
Building damage

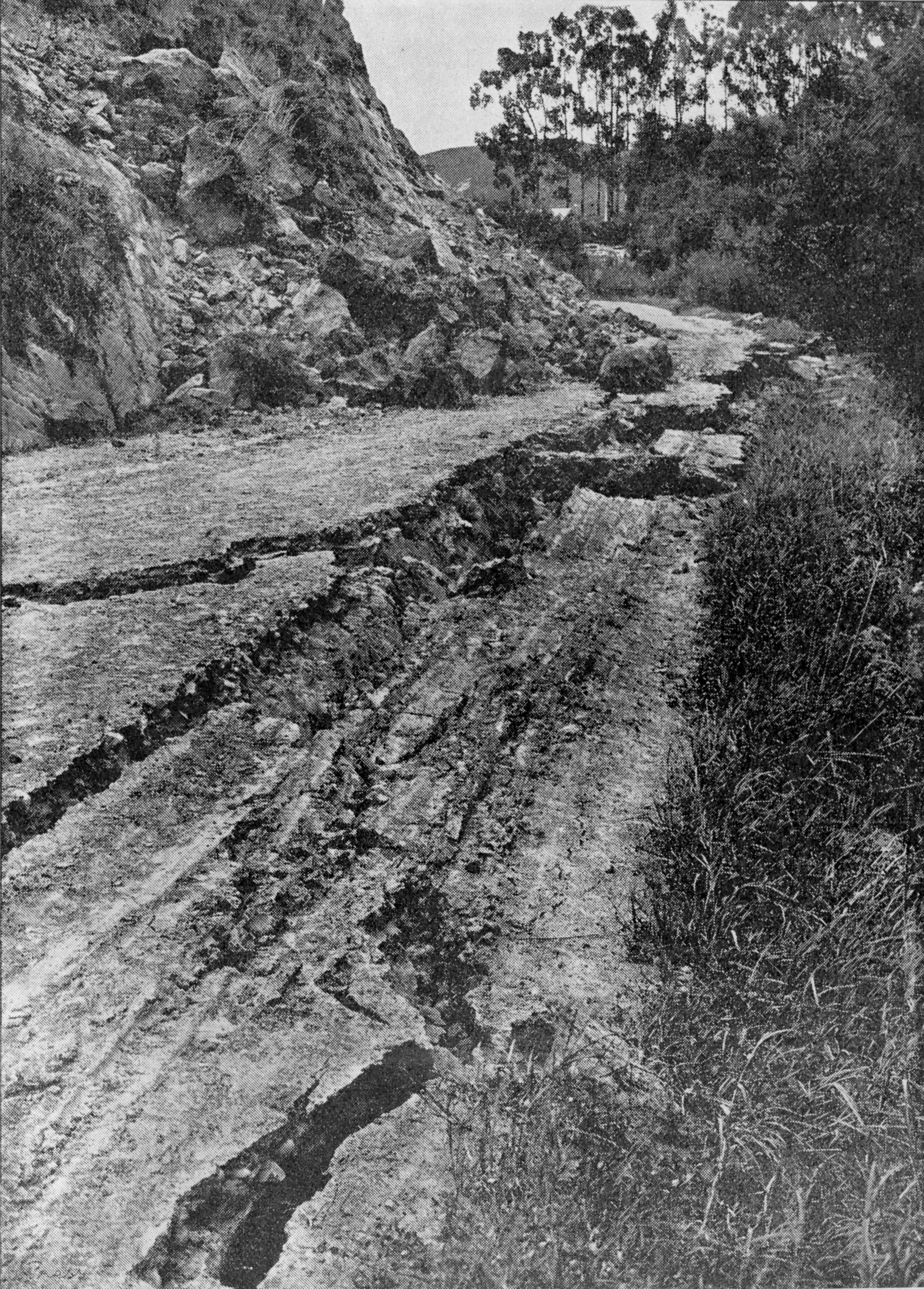
Cracks in the road to Port Robinson

== See also ==
- List of earthquakes in 1901
- List of earthquakes in New Zealand
