= List of natural disasters in New Zealand =

This list of natural disasters in New Zealand documents notable natural disasters and epidemics that have occurred in New Zealand since 1843. Of these natural disasters, the 1918 flu pandemic resulted in the highest loss of life with 8,600 deaths in New Zealand.

== Notable natural disasters ==
Colour pink scheme used in this table:
Earthquake
Flooding
Health Crisis
Landslide
Tsunami
Volcanic eruption
Weather
Wildfires

Year	Type	Deaths	Place	Region	Cost	Note	Reference
1843	Earthquake	2	Wanganui	Manawatu		M 7+	1843 Wanganui earthquake
1846	Landslide	60	Lake Taupo	Waikato		Worst landslide in New Zealand History	
1848	Earthquake	3	Blenheim	Marlborough		M 7.5	1848 Marlborough earthquake
1855	Earthquake	9	Wairarapa	Wellington		M 8.3	1855 Wairarapa earthquake
1855	Tsunami		Cook Strait	Cook Strait		Maximum wave heights of 11m	
1858	Flooding	14	Hutt Valley	Wellington			
1863	Flooding	200	Central Otago	Otago		Floods and snowstorm	
1868	Weather	40	New Zealand	Nationwide		Cyclone	Great storm of 1868
1868	Flooding	9	Totara, Waiareka Valley	Otago			
1868	Tsunami	1	East coast of New Zealand	Chile		Maximum wave heights of 7m	
1877	Tsunami		East coast of New Zealand	Chile		Maximum wave heights of 3m	
1878	Flooding	3	Clutha Valley	Otago			Great Clutha flood of 1878
1885	Earthquake	3	Paekakariki	Wellington		M 5–6	
1886	Volcanic	153	Mount Tarawera	Bay of Plenty		Death toll ranges 108–153 depending on source	1886 eruption of Mount Tarawera
1888	Earthquake	1	Hanmer Springs	Canterbury		M 7+	1888 North Canterbury earthquake
1897	Flooding	12	Clive	Hawke's Bay			
1901	Earthquake	1	Cheviot	Canterbury		M 6.8	1901 Cheviot earthquake
1904	Landslide	8	Brunner	West Coast			
1904	Earthquake	1	Cape Turnagain	Manawatu		M 7	1904 Cape Turnagain earthquake
1913	Earthquake	1	Masterton	Wellington		M 5.6	
1914	Landslide	1	Ngatapa	Gisborne			
1914	Volcanic	10	White Island	Bay of Plenty		Lahar	
1914	Earthquake	1	East Cape	Gisborne		M 6.6	1914 East Cape earthquakes
1918	Wildfire	3	Raetihi	Manawatu			Raetihi forest fire
1918	Health Crisis	8,600	Nationwide	New Zealand		Influenza virus struck between October and December 1918	
1923	Landslide	17	Taumaranui	Manawatu		Landslide hit Auckland to Wellington express train near Taumaranui, killing 17 and injuring 30	Ongarue railway disaster
1923	Landslide	2	Little River	Canterbury			
1924	Flooding	1	Kaiwaka	Hawke's Bay			
1924	Landslide	1	Napier	Hawke's Bay		Slip happened on Shakespeare Rd.	
1924	Tsunami		Chatham Islands	Unknown		Maximum wave heights of 6m	
1929	Weather	1	East coast of New Zealand	Bay of Plenty, Otago		Cyclone, caused violent wind in northeastern North Island and flooding throughout Dunedin and coastal Otago	1929 New Zealand cyclone
1929	Earthquake	17	Murchison	Tasman		M 7.8	1929 Murchison earthquake
1931	Earthquake	256	Napier/Hastings	Hawke's Bay		Official death toll of 256, reported death toll of 258. M 7.8	1931 Hawke's Bay earthquake
1934	Earthquake	2	Pahiatua	Manawatu		M 7.2	1934 Pahiatua earthquake
1936	Weather	12	New Zealand	North Island		Cyclone, caused widespread flooding and destruction	1936 New Zealand cyclone
1938	Flooding	21	Kopuawhara	Hawke's Bay			Kopuawhara flash flood of 1938
1942	Earthquake	1	Wairarapa	Wellington		M 6.9	1942 Wairarapa earthquakes
1942	Weather	1	Kaitaia	Northland		Tornado	
1947	Tsunami		East Coast	Gisborne		Maximum wave heights of 10m. 25 March	
1947	Tsunami		East Coast	Gisborne		Maximum wave heights of 5m. 17 May	
1948	Weather	3	Hamilton	Waikato	$65,434,000 (2010 dollars)	Tornado	
1953	Volcanic	151	Tangiwai	Manawatu		Lahar destroyed rail bridge, sending train into river	Tangiwai disaster
1953	Weather	1	Auckland	Auckland		Tornado	
1960	Tsunami		East coast of New Zealand	Chile		Maximum wave heights of 4.5m	
1967	Weather	1	North Island	New Zealand		Cyclone	Cyclone Dinah
1968	Earthquake	3	Inangahua	West Coast		M 7.1	1968 Inangahua earthquake
1968	Weather	59 (Note: 53 on TEV Wahine and 6 elsewhere in the country)	North Island	North Island		Cyclone	Cyclone Giselle
1973	Weather	1	Opunake	Taranaki		Tornado	
1975	Weather	2	Nationwide	New Zealand		Cyclone	Cyclone Alison
1976	Weather	1	Hutt Valley, Wellington	Wellington		Heavy rain caused slips and flooding	1976 Wellington storm
1978	Flooding		Clutha Valley	Otago			1978 Otago flood
1979	Landslide		Dunedin	Otago		69 houses destroyed	1979 Abbotsford landslip
1980	Weather	1	Auckland	Auckland		Tornado	
1982	Weather	2	Northern North Island	New Zealand		Cyclone	Cyclone Bernie
1984	Flooding		Invercargill	Southland	$100,000,000+		1984 Southland floods
1985	Landslide	3	Te Aroha	Waikato			
1987	Earthquake	1	Edgecumbe	Bay of Plenty	$300,000,000	M 6.3	1987 Edgecumbe earthquake
1988	Weather	7	East Coast of North Island	North Island	$229,000,000	Cyclone	Cyclone Bola
1989	Weather		Northland	New Zealand		Cyclone	Cyclone Delilah
1990	Weather		Taranaki	New Zealand		Cyclone	Cyclone Hilda
1991	Weather	1	Auckland	Auckland		Tornado	
1994	Weather		Southwestern South Island	New Zealand		Cyclone	Cyclone Rewa
1996	Weather		Eastern North Island	New Zealand		Cyclone	Cyclone Beti
1996	Weather	2	Northern North Island	New Zealand		Cyclone	Cyclone Fergus
1997	Weather	3	Nationwide	New Zealand		Cyclone	Cyclone Drena
1997	Weather		North Island	New Zealand		Cyclone	Cyclone Gavin
1998	Weather	1	Nationwide	New Zealand		Cyclone	Cyclone Yali
2001	Weather	4	Northern North Island	New Zealand		Cyclone	Cyclone Sose
2003	Earthquake		Fiordland	Southland		M_{S} 7.2	2003 Fiordland earthquake
2004	Weather	3	Nationwide	New Zealand	$148,000,000	A storm brought high winds, heavy rain, flooding, and slips to much of the North Island as well as the upper South Island. Manawatū-Whanganui and Wellington were particularly hard hit. Two people drowned in the sea in Wellington and one person is presumed to have drowned in the Marlborough Sounds.	
2004	Weather	2	Northeastern North Island	New Zealand		Cyclone	Cyclone Ivy
2004	Landslide	2	Owira	Bay of Plenty			
2004	Earthquake	1	Lake Rotomā	Bay of Plenty		M 5.4	
2004	Weather	2	Waitara	Taranaki		Tornado	
2006	Volcanic	1	Raoul Island	Kermedec Islands			2006 Raoul Island eruption
2007	Earthquake	1	Gisborne	Gisborne	$50,000,000	M 6.7	2007 Gisborne earthquake
2008	Weather		North Island	New Zealand		Cyclone	Cyclone Funa
2008	Flooding	7	Mangatepopo stream	Manawatū-Whanganui		A flash flood killed 6 students and 1 teacher from Elim Christian College who were at the Sir Edmund Hillary Outdoor Pursuits Centre during a gorge trip.	Mangatepopo Canyon disaster
2009	Weather	1	Nationwide	New Zealand		Cyclone	Cyclone Innis
2009	Health Crisis	69	Nationwide	New Zealand		Swine flu infects 3,175 people and results in 69 deaths	2009 flu pandemic in New Zealand
2010	Earthquake	2	Darfield	Canterbury	$4,000,000,000	M 7.1	2010 Canterbury earthquake
2011	Weather		Northern North Island	New Zealand		Cyclone	Cyclone Wilma
2011	Earthquake	185	Christchurch	Canterbury	$42,000,000,000	M 6.3	2011 Christchurch earthquake
2011	Weather	1	Auckland	Auckland	$6,300,000	Tornado	
2011	Earthquake	1	Christchurch	Canterbury		M 6.4	June 2011 Christchurch earthquake
2011	Weather		Nationwide	New Zealand		Snowstorm	2011 New Zealand snowstorms
2011	Earthquake	1	Christchurch	Canterbury		M 5.9 December aftershock	
2012	Weather	3	Auckland	Auckland		Tornado	
2012	Weather	1	North Island	New Zealand		Cyclone	Cyclone Evan
2013	Weather		Nationwide	New Zealand			2013 New Zealand winter storm
2013	Earthquake	1	Seddon	Marlborough		M 6.5	2013 Seddon earthquake
2013	Earthquake	1	Lake Grassmere	Marlborough		M 6.6	2013 Lake Grassmere earthquake
2013	Landslide	2	Haast Pass / Tioripatea	West Coast			
2014	Earthquake	1	Eketāhuna	Manawatū-Whanganui		M 6.2	2014 Eketāhuna earthquake
2014	Weather		Nationwide	New Zealand		Cyclone	Cyclone Ita
2014	Flooding	2	Northland	North Island			
2014	Earthquake	1	East Cape	Gisborne		M 6.5	
2015	Flooding	1	Petone	Wellington			
2015	Flooding		South Dunedin	Otago	$138,000,000	On 3 June 2015, a low weather system brought heavy rain to the coastal Otago Region. South Dunedin experienced heavy flooding, which was exacerbated by the area's high water table and the breakdown of the Portobello pumping station. 1,200 homes and businesses were damaged by flood damage.	2015 Otago flood
2016	Health Crisis	3	Havelock North	Hawke's Bay	$21,000,000	Campylobacter infects 5,200 people and results in 3 deaths	
2016	Earthquake	2	Kaikōura	Canterbury	$2,270,000,000	M 7.8	2016 Kaikōura earthquake
2017	Wildfire	1	Port Hills	Canterbury	$18,300,000		2017 Port Hills fires
2017	Flooding		Edgecumbe	Bay of Plenty	$91,460,000	Cyclone	Cyclone Debbie
2017	Weather		North Island	New Zealand	$17,200,000	Cyclone	Cyclone Cook
2018	Weather		Northwestern South Island	New Zealand	$45,900,000	Cyclone	Cyclone Fehi
2018	Weather		Northwestern South Island	New Zealand	$35,600,000	Cyclone	Cyclone Gita
2019	Wildfire		Pigeon Valley	Tasman			Pigeon Valley Fire
2019	Health Crisis	2	Nationwide	New Zealand			2019 New Zealand measles outbreak
2019	Weather		Timaru	Canterbury	$170,000,000	Hailstorm	2019 Timaru hailstorm
2019	Volcanic	22	Whakaari / White Island	Bay of Plenty			2019 Whakaari / White Island eruption
2020	Flooding	3	Southern South Island	Southland and Otago	$29,640,000		
2020	Health Crisis	3,944	Nationwide	New Zealand		COVID-19 leads to nationwide lockdowns in late March 2020 and August 2021 and an Auckland-wide lockdown in August 2020. Over a million people get infected.	COVID-19 pandemic in New Zealand
2020	Wildfire		Lake Ōhau	Canterbury	$35,180,000		Lake Ōhau Fire
2021	Weather	1	Auckland	Auckland	$32,000,000	Tornado	
2021	Flooding		Northern South Island	Buller District, Tasman District, and Marlborough Region	$140,470,000	Torrential rain in mid-July 2021 led to flooding in the West Coast's Buller District, Tasman District, and Marlborough regions of the South Island, prompting evacuations of residents and state of emergency. The extreme rain event of 15–18 July brought over 690 mm (27 in) of rain to parts of the West Coast Region in under 72 hours.	2021 central New Zealand floods
2021	Flooding	1	Auckland	Auckland	$62,290,000	Heavy rainfall caused extensive flooding and slips in western Auckland. One person drowned in floodwaters in the suburb of Henderson.	
2022	Tsunami		Northern North Island	Tonga	$5,930,000	The tsunami from the eruption of Hunga Tonga–Hunga Haʻapai caused a 1.33 metre tsunami at Great Barrier Island, while millions dollars of damage was done at a marina in Tutukaka.	
2022	Weather		North Island	New Zealand	$54,840,000	Cyclone	Cyclone Dovi
2022	Weather	5	North Island	New Zealand	$119,640,000	A low-pressure system that migrated across the North Island from the Tasman Sea to off East Cape caused severe thunderstorms and extensive flooding in the Auckland and Gisborne regions. Five people were killed when their boat capsized off North Cape in the stormy weather.	
2022	Weather	1	North Island	New Zealand	$11,050,000	A line of thunderstorms accompanied by gale-force winds passed across the North Island. A tornado in Levin caused extensive damage, while in Cambridge a woman was killed after a tree fell on her.	
2022	Flooding		Nationwide	New Zealand	$67,840,000	Heavy persistent rain in mid-August led to widespread evacuations, flooding, and landslides in Nelson, Tasman, Marlborough, West Coast, Northland, Taranaki, and Wellington.	2022 New Zealand floods
2023	Weather	1 (Note: indirect)	North Island	New Zealand		Cyclone	Cyclone Hale
2023	Flooding	4	Northern North Island	New Zealand	At least $1,300,000,000	From 27 January to 2 February, catastrophic floods occurred in the Auckland, Northland and Waikato regions which resulted in states of emergency, with Auckland being the worst affected. NIWA reported a record breaking 160.6 millimetres (10 in) of rainfall across the city in a span of 3 hours.	2023 Auckland Anniversary Weekend floods
2023	Weather	15	North Island	New Zealand	Estimated $13,000,000,000	From Sunday 12 February to Wednesday 15 February, Cyclone Gabrielle struck the North Island, resulting in significant damage and flooding, and a national state of emergency being declared, the third time in the nation's history.	Cyclone Gabrielle
2023	Flooding	1	Northern North Island and Northern South Island	New Zealand		On Tuesday 9 May, a state of emergency was declared in Auckland after torrential rains caused severe flooding. There were also impacts in Northland, Waikato, and Bay of Plenty. A school student was swept away in floodwaters on a field trip to the Abbey Caves. Additionally a few days prior on Saturday 6 May parts of the upper South Island were evacuated due major flooding.	
2023	Flooding		Southland Region and Otago	New Zealand		Heavy rain on 21 September caused flooding in several places across the Southland and Otago regions including Gore and Queenstown. 100 homes were evacuated in Queenstown and Tuatapere's water treatment plant was damaged. A state of emergency was declared in the Southland Region.	2023 southern New Zealand floods
2024	Wildfire		Port Hills	Canterbury		A wildfire broke out on 14 February, seven years and one day since the 2017 Port Hills fires. A state of emergency was declared, with evacuations of residential properties.	2024 Port Hills fire
2024	Flooding		Hastings and Wairoa	Gisborne District and Hawke's Bay		Torrential rain leads to flooding in the East Coast regions, resulting in evacuations and local states of emergency being declared in Hastings and Wairoa. 400 properties were flooded in Wairoa. Wairoa sustained NZ$40 million worth of flood damage.	2024 East Coast floods
2024	Flooding		Dunedin, North Otago and the Clutha District	Coastal Otago	NZ$33.8 million in insurance claims	Heavy rainfall leads to significant flooding and lanslides in the coastal Otago region. States of emergency were declared by local authorities in Dunedin and the Clutha District on 3 and 4 October. The flood event damaged 50 homes, businesses, farms, roads, water treatment plants in the coastal Otago region.	2024 Otago floods
2025	Weather		North Island	New Zealand	$51,390,000	Cyclone	Cyclone Tam
2025	Flooding		Selwyn District and Wellington	Canterbury and Wellington Regions		In response to heavy rainfall and flooding, a state of emergency was declared in the Selwyn District on 1 May 2025. The Banks peninsula was also cut off due to flooding. That same day, strong winds, large tides and wet weather led MetService to issue a red wind warning, and Wellington City Council encouraged residents in Ōwhiro Bay to self-evacuate. In addition, all flights in and out of Wellington International Airport were cancelled due to strong winds. Following torrential rain and flooding, a state of emergency was declared in Christchurch. Homes were also evacuated in the Selwyn District and Akaroa due to flooding.	May 2025 New Zealand storm
2025	Flooding	1		Nelson, Tasman District and Marlborough District		Severe wet weather affected the Tasman, Nelson and Marlborough Districts of New Zealand's South Island in late June 2025. On 26 June, a state of emergency was declared in the Wairau-Awatere Ward of Marlborough due to heavy rain and flooding. By 27 June, another state of emergency was declared in Nelson and the Tasman due to heavy rain and flooding. The wet weather caused serious flooding in Spring Creek and Motueka, displaced several residents in the Marlborough and Tasman Districts, and disrupted flights.	Winter 2025 New Zealand floods
2025	Weather	1	Nationwide	All of the South Island, Hawke's Bay, Wellington Region, Tararua District	7,000 insurance claims, with FMG Insurance estimating NZ$28 million in wind damage in Southland and Otago. $2.39 million worth of damage to infrastructure and property in Invercargill.	High winds struck the southern part of the North Island, Hawkes Bay and large parts of the South Island on the 20th of October causing power outages and red weather warnings. Flights were cancelled at Wellington airport before being resumed and some buildings were damaged in Wellington. A man was killed by a tree in Mount Victoria, Wellington. Strong winds also caused several fires in Kaikōura and the Hawkes Bay. On 23 September, severe winds struck Canterbury, Otago and Southland, resulting in significant damage to buildings and power infrastructure. States of emergency were declared in Canterbury, the Clutha District and Southland due to widespread storm damage.	October 2025 New Zealand storms
2026	Weather	10	North Island	Northland Region, Auckland Region Bay of Plenty Region, Gisborne District		Beginning on 15 January 2026, a series of storm systems brought severe weather to the upper North Island of New Zealand, peaking with the passage of the remnants of Tropical Disturbance 05F (previously known as Tropical Low 14U while it was in the Australian region) across the upper North Island on 21 and 22 January. During this period, one man died after being swept away near Warkworth,, two people died after a landslide hit a house in Papamoa,, six people were killed by a landslide at a campground in Mount Maunganui.and another man drowned after falling off his boat. States of emergency were also declared in the Whangarei, Thames-Coromandel Districts and the Bay of Plenty Region.	January 2026 New Zealand storms
2026	Weather	1	Nationwide	New Zealand		A wet weather systems brings heavy rain, flash flooding and land slips to parts of the North and South Islands in mid-February 2026. States of emergency are declared in the Ōtorohanga, Waipā , Tararua, Manawatū, Rangitīkei Districts and Banks Peninsula. Plane, ferry, train and road travel is disrupted in several districts in both islands. One man is killed after his car is submerged at Puketotara on State Highway 93 on 14 February.	February 2026 New Zealand storms
2026	Weather	0	North Island	Northland, Bay of Plenty, Hawkes Bay			Cyclone Vaianu (2026)
2026	Weather	1	North Island			A state of emergency is declared in the Wellington Region after 77mm of rain falls, causing surface flooding, evacuations and damages to homes. A man died after he was swept away.	

== See also ==
- List of disasters in New Zealand by death toll
- List of New Zealand tornadoes
- List of natural disasters in Australia
