= List of New Zealand tornadoes =

New Zealand experiences several tornadoes each year, with current estimates ranging from 7 to 10. This article contains a list of notable tornadoes recorded in New Zealand.

== Climatology and background ==
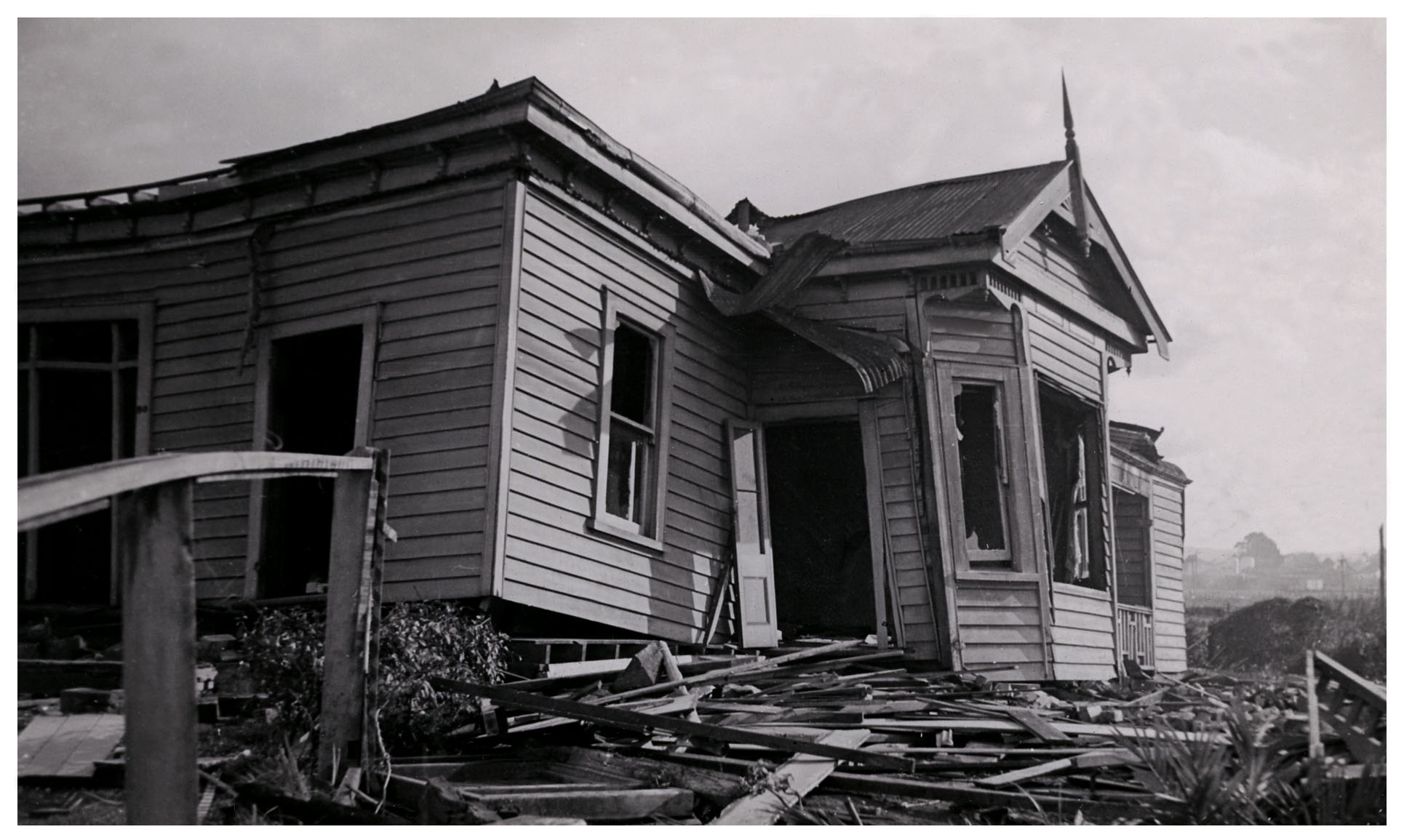
Damage from the 1948 Frankton tornado

A tornado refers to a violently rotating column of air that reaches the ground, which can be among the most destructive of all atmospheric phenomena. Each year, there are 7–10 damaging tornadoes that touch down in New Zealand, occurring mostly along the west coast of both islands. Tornadoes in New Zealand most often form from squall lines ahead of cold fronts, which have the potential to spawn mesocyclones capable of tornadogenesis. Tornadoes in the country are usually short-lived, narrow, and weak. However, the country's National Institute of Water and Atmospheric Research (NIWA) assessed the 1948 Frankton tornado as an EF3 on the Enhanced Fujita scale, making it New Zealand's strongest known tornado. The 1948 tornado was also its most impactful, with 200 buildings damaged, as well as a rare deadly tornado in the country, with three deaths.

Most tornadoes in New Zealand fall within the EF0 to EF1 range, with wind speeds typically not exceeding 178 km/h. Occasional EF2 tornadoes are observed, but these are rare. The most severe tornado on record was an EF3, which struck Frankton, Hamilton in 1948.

== Events ==
"#F" is the event's rating on the Enhanced Fujita scale.

=== 19th and 20th centuries ===
Tornado event	Date	Area	Tornadoes	Casualties	Notes	F#
Parnell tornado	December 1863	Parnell	1	0 fatalities, numerous injuries	A tornado passed through part of Auckland suburb of Parnell, destroying every building and tree it came across, causing a total of £5,000 in damage.	FU
Kaitaia tornado	26 August 1942	Kaitaia	1	1 fatality, 8 injuries	A tornado struck the town of Kaitaia in the Northland Region and damaged or destroyed numerous buildings in the town. A bus and car were also tossed into the air and destroyed. One person was killed and eight others were injured.	FU
Frankton (Hamilton) tornado	25 August 1948	Waikato	1	3 fatalities, 80 injuries	The F2 or F3 rated tornado caused damage or destruction to 163 buildings and 50 businesses, causing about £1,000,000 in property damage ($65,434,000 in 2010 dollars).	F2/F3
Bay of Plenty tornado	28 May 1968	Ōmokoroa, Bay of Plenty	1	0 fatalities, 0 injuries	A tornado ripped across the Bay of Plenty coastline near Tauranga, affecting Ōmokoroa, Pukehina Beach and Paengaroa. Several homes were heavily damaged in Pukehina Beach, including a newly built two-story home that was flattened. No casualties were reported.	FU
Halswell tornado	19 January 1983	Halswell, Christchurch	1	0 fatalities, unknown injured	This tornado was part of a severe storm that struck Christchurch. Authorities did not believe reports made by citizens, as few buildings were damaged.	FU
Auckland Region tornadoes	24 April 1991	Auckland region	4	0 fatalities, unknown injured	Tornadoes and high winds impacted portions of the Auckland region, causing significant damage to homes and businesses. A tornado at Pouto Point injured at least two people and heavily damaged a wooden marae hall, leaving behind only the floor and concrete steps. An empty house and a woolshed were also wrecked. Damage in Pouto Point was estimated at NZ$1 million. Tornadoes were also reported in Dairy Flat, Port Charles, and Albany. Trees were blown down in Dairy Flat, damaging three cars and injuring two occupants.	FU
Albany tornado	May 1991	Albany	1	1 fatality, unknown injured	A local church destroyed. One man driving a bulldozer was killed by flying debris.	FU
Nelson tornado	1 June 2000	Nelson	1	0 fatalities, 0 injuries	Occurred at 7:30 AM. Cars at the Nelson airport were flung, several schools were damaged, one hangar door destroyed. Eyewitnesses described the tornado as a dark narrow spiral.	FU
Bay of Islands tornado	30 August 2000	Northland	1	0 fatalities, 0 injuries	Damaged farmland at 5:30 AM.	FU
Paraparaumu tornado	9 October 2000	Wellington	1	0 fatalities, 0 injuries	Ripped iron of the roof off a house and garage on Paraparaumu beach between 8:20 and 8:30 AM. Uprooted trees and fences.	FU

=== 2001-2010 ===
Tornado event	Date	Area	Tornadoes	Casualties	Notes	F#
Clevedon tornado	4 January 2001	Auckland	1	0 fatalities, 0 injuries	A tornado was captured moving across Clevedon.	FU
Greymouth tornado	28 March 2001	West Coast	1	0 fatalities, 0 injuries	Ripped through Greymouth at around 4:00 AM. Houses and garages badly damaged.	FU
Katikati/ Ōmokoroa tornado	23 August 2001	Bay of Plenty	1	0 fatalities, 0 injuries	Trees damaged and parts of a fence were found more than 100 metres away. The severe winds lasted for a minute in Ōmokoroa at 7:15 PM. A garage roof was lifted.	FU
Cable Bay/Mata tornadoes	9 October 2001	Northland	2	0 fatalities, 0 injuries	A 100 metre wide tornado damaged 19 Houses, some extensivley at roughly 12:30 PM in Cable Bay. Another tornado moved a barn 100 metres across a paddock.	FU
Awakeri tornadoes	4 November 2001	Bay of Plenty	4	0 fatalities, 0 injuries	4 tornadoes seen at Awakeri. A shed was completely destroyed by one of the tornadoes, narrowly missing residents.	FU
Levin tornado	4 January 2002	Manawatū-Whanganui	1	0 fatalities, 0 injuries	Uprooted trees on the Levin golf course just before 4:00 PM.	FU
Auckland tornado	24 October 2002	Auckland	1	0 fatalities, 0 injuries	Iron roofing was ripped of a house, fences were toppled and atleast one tree was brought down in Blockhouse Bay and Lynfield at 11:00 AM.	FU
Tai Tapu/Christchurch tornado	27 October 2002	Canterbury	1	0 fatalities, 0 injuries	Trees were damaged in Tai Tapu and a tornado was sighted in Halswell.	FU
Auckland tornado	29 October 2002	Auckland	1	0 fatalities, 0 injuries	A tornado was sighted in Auckland.	FU
Greymouth tornado	16 June 2003	West Coast	1	0 fatalities, 0 injuries	The tornado came in from the Tasman sea at around 9:45 AM. 20 businesses were damaged in the downtown area, a building on Albert St was made unusable as the back wall was bowed by the tornado. The damage inflicted costs of more than NZ$300,000.	FU
Westport tornado	2 November 2003	West Coast	1	0 fatalities, 0 injuries	A room and the roof of a house were blown off at roughly 4:00 AM.	FU
Waitara tornado	15 August 2004	Taranaki	1	2 fatalities, 2 seriously injured	The casualties occurred when a farmhouse was demolished by the tornado. Several power lines were taken out, affecting 6,662 consumers and 1,200 homes. Media reports included debris 'spread over an area 400 metres long by 50 metres wide', although other media outlets described the track length as being greater than 1 kilometre (3,300 ft). The tornado was assessed as F3 on the Fujita scale, making it the strongest on record in New Zealand.	F3
Masterton/Carterton tornado	17 October 2004	Wairarapa	1	0 fatalities, 0 injuries	A tornado was seen forming near Masterton and Carterton in the late afternoon.	FU
Omakere tornado	18 October 2004	Hawke's Bay	1	0 fatalities, 0 injuries	Eyewitnesses reported seeing mature trees being ripped out of the ground and flying in circles. According to one family, the funnel touched down behind a row of Poplar trees, 100 metres from their home. Some of the trees ripped out by the winds were century old Gum trees. The path left by the tornado was around 500 metres long and 15-20 metres wide.	FU
Auckland tornado	22 December 2004	Auckland	1	0 fatalities, 0 injuries	In Penrose and Mount Wellington six houses were damaged and a truck was moved by the winds.	FU
Greymouth tornado	10 March 2005	West Coast	1	0 fatalities, 6 injuries	The path of devastation was approximately 4 kilometres (2.5 mi) long and 400 metres (1,300 ft) wide. It had an F1 rating with winds speeds of around 180 km/h. It was estimated that the tornado lasted 10 seconds. The insurance industry payouts for the tornado was NZ$9,200,000 (2005 money). Two tornadoes touched down in Greymouth within two years. Up to 30 people were made homeless. Six people received injuries from the tornado. Two people were admitted to hospital with moderate injuries, and one was treated and discharged. The St John's ambulance treated another three people for minor cuts and bruises. One woman was injured when the tornado flipped over the campervan she was sitting in. A 12-tonne truck was overturned along with a number of cars. West Coast is one of the most tornado-prone areas of New Zealand.	F1
Kawerau tornado	25 March 2005	Bay of Plenty	1	0 fatalities, 0 injuries	Trees and properties were damaged by tornado-like winds.	FU
Greymouth tornado	4 April 2005	West Coast	1	0 fatalities, 0 injuries	A small tornado was sighted.	FU
Motunui/Urenui tornado	2 May 2005	Taranaki	1	0 fatalities, 0 injuries	An orchard was damaged and a farm shed was destroyed in the early morning.	FU
Rotorua tornado	1 June 2005	Bay of Plenty	1	0 fatalities, 0 injuries	Trees were toppled and 1000 homes had their electricity cut.	FU
Auckland tornadoes	25 June 2005	Auckland	>2	0 fatalities, 0 injuries	The University of Auckland Atmospheric Physics Group (UoAAPG) observed a weak multiple tornado system passing over Ardmore on their mobile X-Band radar. The first tornadic vortex signature observed on radar produced several vorticies, one persisting for longer than a minute. The second vortex lasted for over 10 minutes taking a slightly deviated path along high tension power lines. The first tornado started at 11:52:30, moving from the northwest. Around 10 minutes later the tornado breaks down into multiple vorticies and spawns a new tornado, continuing for around 12 minutes. The path of destruction damaged the roof and windows of a property.	F0
Hokitika tornado	5 September 2005	West Coast	1	0 fatalities, 0 injuries	The roof of a house was lifted, windows were smashed, a furniture truck was overturned and a trail of damage was left. Occurred at 12:30 AM.	FU
Auckland tornado	11 October 2005	Auckland	1	0 fatalities, 0 injuries	Western Springs, Kingsland and Morningside were affected by a tornado just after 1:00 AM, resulting in damaged roofs.	FU
Matamata tornado	15 October 2005	Waikato	1	0 fatalities, 0 injuries	Power lines, trees, fences and an Okorore barn were damaged by high winds associated with a tornado.	FU
Rotorua tornado	6 December 2005	Bay of Plenty	1	0 fatalities, 0 injuries	A property was damaged by brief tornado-like winds.	FU
Heddon tornado	15 December 2005	Southland	1	0 fatalities, 0 injuries	Trees fell.	FU
Oakura tornado	8 February 2006	Taranaki	1	0 fatalities, 0 injuries	A caravan was toppled on Okura Beach Holiday Park by winds associated with that of a tornado at about 4:00 AM.	FU
Waimate tornado	3 March 2006	Waimate	1	0 fatalities, 0 injuries	A strong tornado impacted rural properties to the southeast of Waimate along a 1.6 kilometres (0.99 mi) path. A historic two-story home lost its roof and second floor. The tornado also ripped apart grain silos and sheds. Several head of livestock were killed, and five people were left homeless.	FU
Kāpiti Coast tornado	8 April 2006	Wellington	1	0 fatalities, 0 injuries	A roof was lifted off a house in the morning by tornado-like winds.	FU
Leamington tornado	20 April 2006	Waikato	1	0 fatalities, 0 injuries	A property was damaged in Leamington.	FU
Ruawai tornado	11 May 2006	Northland	1	0 fatalities, 0 injuries	Half of an iron roof was lifted off a house and debris was scattered up to 500 metres away. Occurred at about 11:50 AM.	FU
Greymouth tornado	11 June 2006	West Coast	1	0 fatalities, 0 injuries	Almost 20 properties were damaged in Greymouth.	FU
Hamilton/Eureka tornadoes	12 July 2006	Waikato	2	0 fatalities, 0 injuries	Trees and a garage destroyed from Hamilton to Eureka by twin tornadoes.	FU
Waiotahi tornado(s)	9 November 2006	Bay of Plenty	>1	0 fatalities, 0 injuries	The majority of a roof was lifted off a house and thrown 60 metres away with the chimney also being destroyed. Occurred at 10:00 AM.	FU
Pembroke tornado	21 March 2007	Taranaki	1	0 fatalities, 0 injuries	Occurred at about 12:45 PM. A hall near Pembroke School had its roof ripped off. Witnesses heard an incredible noise and saw debris flying in the air.	FU
Tauranga tornado	2 May 2007	Bay of Plenty	1	0 fatalities, 0 injuries	A damaging tornado occurred.	FU
Greymouth tornado	11 May 2007	West Coast	1	0 fatalities, 0 injuries	Roofs were ripped off houses and trees were toppled during the afternoon in the Cobden, Boddytown, and Karoro suburbs.	FU
Invercargill tornado	22 June 2007	Southland	1	0 fatalities, 0 injuries	Occurred at around 3:00 PM. Trees and fences toppled, roofs uplifted and atleast 5 homes were damaged on one street.	FU
New Plymouth tornadoes	4 July 2007	New Plymouth	3	0 fatalities	A series of tornadoes ripped through the New Plymouth district of New Zealand, damaging 50 homes and rendering 70–80% of them uninhabitable. One person was injured, and several were trapped inside vehicles by powerlines.	FU
Te Haroto/Tarawera tornado	29 April 2008	Hawke's Bay	1	0 fatalities, 0 injuries	Occurred at around 3:30 AM. Pine trees were damaged and uprooted. Four power poles were toppled and 100 homes lost power. One property had their windows shattered and outside furniture sent flying by the winds.	FU
Waikouaiti tornado	4 January 2009	Waikouaiti	1	0 fatalities	A tornado struck approximately one kilometre south of the township, damaging the roof of a farmhouse and knocking limbs off trees.	FU

=== 2011-2020 ===
Tornado event	Date	Area	Tornadoes	Casualties	Notes	F#
Auckland tornado	3 May 2011	Auckland	1	1 fatality, 14 injuries	A tornado struck the Auckland suburb of Albany, killing one person and injuring many others.	FU
New Plymouth tornadoes	19 June 2011	New Plymouth	2 confirmed, 1 unconfirmed	0 fatalities	Two tornadoes struck New Plymouth, damaging businesses in the Central Business District, St Mary's Church Hall, and a hotel.	FU
Kapiti Coast tornado	9 July 2011	Waikanae	1	0 fatalities, "several" injuries	A tornado caused several trees to fall over, several rooves to come off buildings, windows to smash and power lines to fall over, which caused a power outage.	FU
Auckland tornado	11 September 2011	Avondale and Te Atatu	1	0 fatalities, 0 injuries	At approximately 1:00 PM a tornado struck through the Auckland suburbs of Avondale and Te Atatu, damaging up to a dozen homes. The tornado downed powerlines and lifted tiling off of roofs. A fire broke out from the powerlines causing trees to catch fire.	FU
Auckland tornado	6 December 2012	Auckland	More than 1	3 fatalities, at least 7 injuries	A tornado struck the Auckland suburb of Hobsonville, killing three people and injuring at least seven others.	FU
Amberley tornado	23 February 2014	Amberley	1	0 fatalities, 1 injury	A tornado struck areas near the North Canterbury town of Amberley, damaging multiple homes and uprooting trees and power poles. The tornado was accompanied by large hail, lightning, and strong winds. One person was injured in the storm.	FU
Mt Maunganui tornado	13 May 2015	Mt Maunganui	1	0 fatalities	A tornado struck the Tauranga suburb of Mt Maunganui, damaging homes and the nearby Baypark Stadium.	FU
Motunui tornado	18 June 2018	Motunui	1	0 fatalities, 0 injuries	A tornado formed in Motunui near the Methanex Plant at 2:10 PM. A driver that was driving along State Highway 3 at the time stated that the tornado crossed the road half a kilometre ahead of him. The driver then recorded the tornado, spinning across open fields. Methanex Stuart McCall stated that the Methanex Plant had suffered minor damage.	FU
Ashburton/Fairton tornado	18 November 2018	Ashburton/Fairton	1	0 fatalities, 0 injuries	A large landspout tornado was filmed from multiple angles as it touched down near Ashburton and Fairton. The tornado remained over open fields, though it caused damage to farm implements and trees. The same storm system also produced marble-sized hail and strong winds.	FU
Coopers Beach tornado	5 June 2019	Coopers Beach	1	0 fatalities	A tornado struck the town of Coopers Beach and caused damage to 15 homes, leaving two to be deemed uninhabitable.	FU
North Island tornadoes	11–12 August 2019	North Island	4	0 fatalities, 2 injuries	Four tornadoes struck the North Island over two consecutive days. Tornadoes struck Auckland and the Taranaki Region, causing major damage. Severe thunderstorms also produced large 'spiky' hail, lightning and heavy rain. Two people were injured by the tornadoes.	FU
Christchurch tornado	18 November 2019	Christchurch	1	2 injuries	An EF0 tornado struck Christchurch and lasted for 15 minutes, injuring two people and causing widespread damage.	F0
Papamoa tornado	27 June 2020	Papamoa	1	0 fatalities	A tornado struck the Tauranga suburb of Papamoa in the early morning and caused some damage to homes. The tornado also sent a trampoline flying across a main road into some trees lining the carpark of a local supermarket.	FU

=== 2021-present ===
Tornado event	Date	Area	Tornadoes	Casualties	Notes	F#
Napier tornado	14 April 2021	Napier	1	unknown injured	A waterspout tornadic system briefly made landfall in Napier. The tornado did not produce any significant damage. There are videos of the tornado from views along Marine Parade and near the Napier Port.	FU
Papatoetoe tornado	19 June 2021	Auckland	1	1 fatality, 2 injuries	A tornado struck the Papatoetoe district in South Auckland. The tornado damaged roofs, trees and shipping containers. A worker at Wiri Station was killed, while two others were injured. About 1,200 homes were affected by the tornado, 60 of which were deemed to be uninhabitable.	FU
Levin tornado	19 May 2022	Horowhenua	1	0 fatalities, 1 injury	The tornado in Levin caused damage to 51 properties, including 17 residential properties. Of this 51, 20 were red-stickered. By 6 July, there had been $8.1 million in insurance claims.	FU
Kāpiti tornadoes	June 2022	Kāpiti	3	0 fatalities, 1 injury	On 1 June two reported tornadoes went through Waikanae, Paraparaumu and Otaihanga, with the first tornado damaging five properties. On 9 a tornado went through the Kāpiti Coast and caused damage to about six homes in Waikanae, five homes in Paraparaumu, as well as to businesses. At least one person was injured.	FU
Tongariro National Park tornado	27 February 2023	Tongariro National Park	1	0 injuries	A weak tornado was seen over the national park.	FU
New Zealand tornadoes	9–11 April 2023	East Auckland, Tasman District, Waitara, Paraparaumu	4	1 injury	On 9 April a tornado in East Auckland caused damage to about 51 properties. On 10 April a tornado in the Tasman District caused damage to about 50 properties. On 11 April a tornado in Waitara, Taranaki, caused a home's roof to lift off. Later that day a tornado in Paraparaumu caused damage to about 20 properties and injured one person.	FU
Lower Hutt tornado	12 December 2023	Wellington	1	0 fatalities, 6 injuries	Six people were injured in the central city as what was described as a tornado that blew in store windows, ripped up roofs, toppled fences, battered buildings and dragged buses along the street.	FU
Mangawhai tornado	26 January 2025	Mangawhai	1	0 fatalities, 2 serious injuries	A tornado and severe storm hit Mangawhai and the surrounding areas, causing two serious injuries, at least four homes to be destroyed, damage to about 50 properties, and about 4700 homes to lose power.	FU
Levin tornado	8 April 2025	Horowhenua	1	0 fatalities, 0 injuries	Tornado in Levin at about 7:45 am that took off roofs and knocked over fences. No injuries or fatalities have been reported.	FU
Hamilton tornado	30 May 2025	Hamilton	1	0 fatalities, 0 injuries	On Friday night at about 8 PM, a tornado in Hamilton struck. A trampoline became airborne and lodged into a power box, cutting power to 75 properties. A witness stated "I opened the door and saw everything being lifted upwards,"	FU
Cape Egmont tornadoes	10 June 2025	Cape Egmont, Taranaki	1, 1 unconfirmed	0 fatalities, 0 injuries	At 9:53 AM on the 10th, a tornado was spotted on the ground at Cape Egmont, Taranaki. This led MetService to issue a Severe Thunderstorm Watch for the rest of the day. At 12:45 PM, another funnel like feature was reported, although it never touched down. Large hailstones excess of 2 cm were reported in these storms.	FU
Auckland funnel	14 June 2025	East Auckland	-	0 fatalities, 0 injuries	On 14 June at about 3 PM, a funnel cloud was reported in the East Auckland area, MetService issued a Severe Thunderstorm Warning for this event. This was not a tornado.	FU
Auckland Tornado	27 June 2025	Blockhouse Bay, Auckland	1	0 fatalities, 0 injuries	Around 11:30 AM strong winds like a tornado were reported in Blockhouse Bay, Auckland where wind gusts of around 90-100kph have been experienced.	FU
Waitara Tornado	28 June 2025	Waitara, New Plymouth	1	0 fatalities, 0 injuries	Residents in Waitara woke up to damaged roofs, moved cars, and ripped out trees. MetService reported 130 km/h gusts and 20 to 30 mm of rain, with a meteorologist unable to confirm that the event was a tornado.	FU
Northland Tornado	15 July 2025	Northland	1	0 fatalities, 1 injury	At 8:05 AM, a tornado formed in Northland, flipping a camper van and tossing another one several meters.	FU
Whakatāne tornado	5 October 2025	Whakatāne	1	0 fatalities, 0 injuries	At 2:45 PM a tornado in Whakatane was reported that struck a man's shed whilst he was inside. He stated "It sounded like a freight train". Roofs were lifted in this event.	FU
Manawatū tornado	3 December 2025	Manawatū	1	0 fatalities, 1 injury	At 12:36pm, emergency services were called to a campground after a caravan flipped in a tornado. One person sustained injuries according to Hato Hone St Johns. MetService had issued a chance of small tornadoes and large hail for most of the day.	FU
Hawke's Bay tornado	29 December 2025	Coast of Waimārama beach	1	unknown injured	A small tornadic system landed off the coast of Waimārama beach in Hawke's Bay. Video footage on the Hawke's Bay Today shows the waterspout system touchdown off the coast.	FU
North Island tornadoes	15 January 2026	Ōtorohanga, Waikato and Orewa, Auckland	1, 1 unconfirmed	unknown injured	A tornado struck rural farmland in Waikato, causing damage to powerlines and trees, but no injuries. In the Auckland suburb of Orewa, a "mini tornado" was reported. MetService could not confirm that this was a tornado, but stated that there were the correct atmospheric conditions for one.	FU
Tauranga tornado	19 April 2026	Tauranga, Welcome Bay, Maungatapu and Ōtūmoetai	1	0 fatalities, 0 injuries	One or more tornadoes moved over the Tauranga area on 19 April. At approximately 1:30 AM, a tornado or possibly more struck the Tauranga area, causing localised damage to areas such as Welcome Bay and Maungatapu. MetService confirmed there was at least 1 tornado in the area, with more damage areas possible based on radar imagery. MetService believes the tornado developed over Matakana Island west of Tauranga, and moved east-southeast over parts of Tauranga. CCTV Footage released by the Tauranga City Council captured the moment the intense system moved across parts of Tauranga, showing a large commercial table rolling across a road, forcing a vehicle to stop in the road. PowerCo says the tornado caused 75 properties to lose power, with several trees being uprooted or scattered around the area. Fire and Emergency New Zealand stated that they responded to seven calls overnight as the storms impacted the area. After the tornado, 6 properties were deemed dangerous or insanitary to live in, and at least 15 properties in total reported some form of structural damage, with 4 families needing temporary accommodation.	FU
Dunedin tornado	29 April 2026	Dunedin	1	0 fatalities, 0 injuries	A 'mini-tornado' tore through the city of Dunedin, damaging the roof of a business and blowing a tree onto a road. A garage door was damaged.	FU
Richmond tornado	4 July 2026	Tasman District	1	0 fatalities, 0 injuries	A localized, short-lived tornado struck the town of Richmond. The tornado damaged 2 homes and took down a property's fence.	FU
Kāpiti Tornado	27 September 2026	Kāpiti Coast	1	0 fatalities, 1 injury	A localized and brief tornado struck the Kāpiti Coast, injuring one woman in a Mitre 10 MEGA car park near Kāpiti Road at approximately 1:00 PM. a tornado struck near Kāpiti Road and passed through a car park. It injured one woman as it passed over her car and shattered her rear windscreen, causing flying glass that cut her arm.	FU

== Climatological statistics ==
The following is a chart showing New Zealand tornadoes by month or by time period.

Number of recorded tornadoes affecting New Zealand
Month	Number of storms
January	4
February	2
March	2
April	6
May	6
June	10
July	3
August	4
September	2
October	2
November	2
December	6

Tornadoes affecting New Zealand by period
Period	Number of storms
1800s	1
1900s	6
2000s	8
2010s	12
2020s	22

== See also ==
- List of natural disasters in New Zealand
- Lists of tornadoes and tornado outbreaks
