= January 2026 New Zealand storms =

January 2026 storms
Meteorological history
- Duration: 15–24 January 2026

Overall effects
- Fatalities: 10 (9 direct, 1 indirect)
- Damage: $45.3 million (2026 USD)
- Areas affected: Upper North Island, New Zealand

Beginning on 15 January 2026, a series of storm systems brought severe weather to the upper North Island of New Zealand, peaking with the passage of the remnants of Tropical Disturbance 05F (previously known as Tropical Low 14U while it was in the Australian region) across the upper North Island on 21 and 22 January.

During this period, one man died after being swept away near Warkworth, two people died after a landslide hit a house in Papamoa, and six people were killed by a landslide at a campground in Mount Maunganui. Another man was also killed after falling off his boat crossing the Waioweka River after the storms. On 21 January, 247.6 mm of rain fell in Whitianga and 274.0 mm of rain fell in Tauranga, marking the wettest day on record for each place. Insurance losses totaled $75.9 million NZD.

== Preparations ==
A preemptive state of emergency was declared in the Whangarei District in response to an approaching heavy rain front on 20 January. Precautionary states of emergency were declared in the Thames-Coromandel District and the Bay of Plenty on 21 January in response to expected heavy rain and flooding. MetService issued Red Warnings on 21 January for significant rain in multiple regions across the upper North Island.

== Impacts ==
=== Tauranga landslides ===
==== Mount Maunganui ====
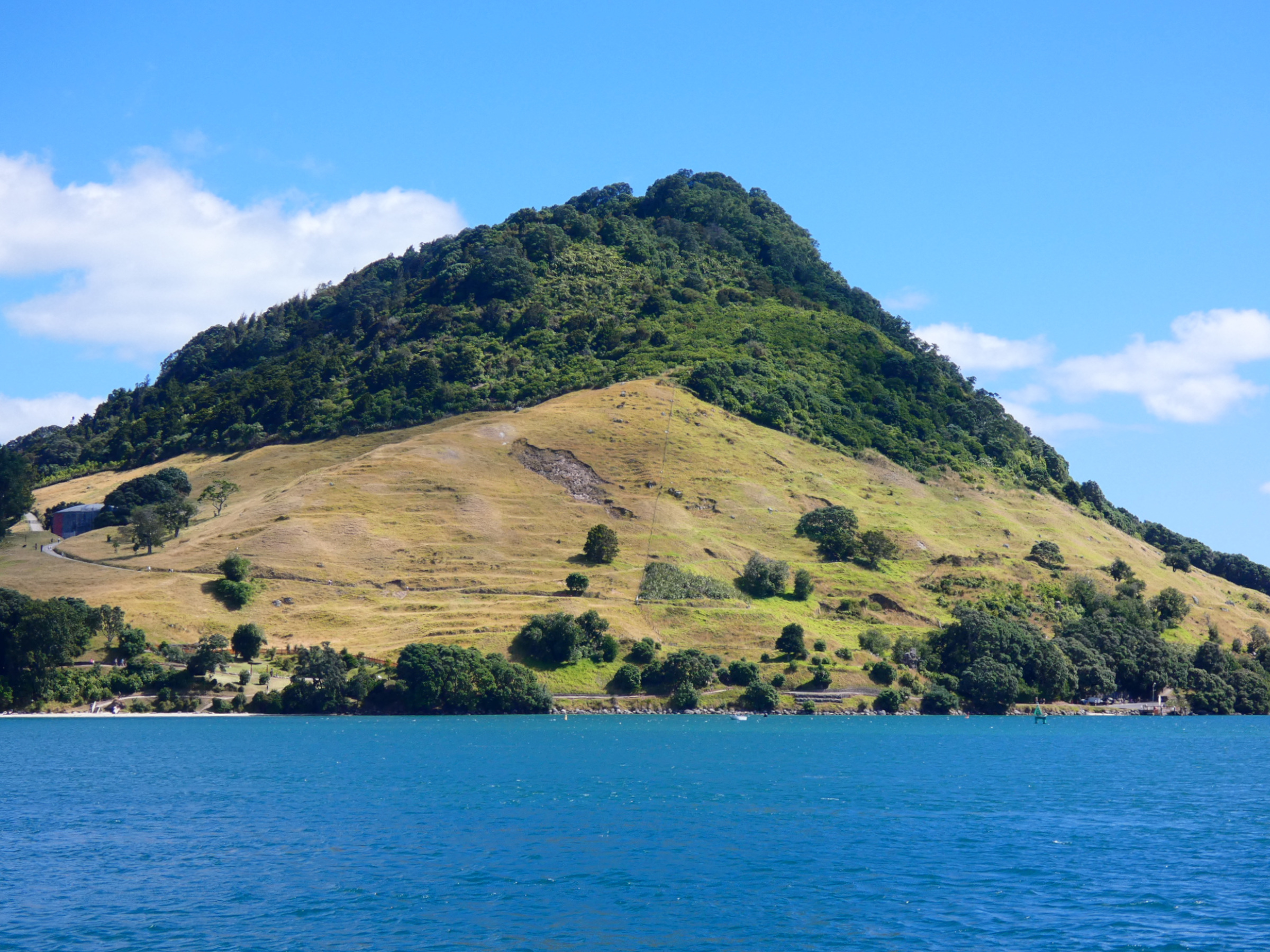
Mount Maunganui two weeks before the landslide

At around 9:30am on 22 January, a major landslide occurred on the popular Mount Maunganui after intense rainfall. The slip collapsed part of the hillside above the Mount Maunganui Beachside Holiday Park, burying several cabins and campervan sites, destroying a toilet block, and damaging the Mount Hot Pools. Emergency services reported six people missing, including children, and launched a large‑scale search and rescue operation involving police, firefighters, and Urban Search and Rescue teams.

On 24 January the rescue operation in Mount Maunganui officially became a recovery, with police saying that no one would have been able to survive. That same day, the police confirmed they had found human remains during the recovery operation. The deceased were identified as 50-year-old Lisa Anne Maclennan from Morrinsville, 20-year-old Måns Loke Bernhardsson from Gothenburg, Sweden, friends Jacqualine Suzanne Wheeler from Rotorua and Susan Doreen Knowles from Ngongotaha, both 71 years old, and couple Sharon Maccanico and Max Furse-Kee, both 15 years old and who attended Pakuranga College in Auckland together.

According to witnesses, earlier in the night before the main landslide, a small slip had impacted Maclennan's campervan. She woke up many holidaygoers at around 5:00am warning them of the danger, and many were able to move away from the base of the mountain. In the hours leading up to the landslide, muddy water was seen streaming down from the hillside around the toilet block, and other slips around the mountain had resulted in the closure of walking tracks.

==== Papamoa ====
At around 4:15am on 22 January, a landslide severely damaged a house on Welcome Bay Road in rural Papamoa, resulting in the deaths of two people. The victims were 71-year-old Chinese national Yao Fang and her 10-year-old grandson Austen Keith Richardson.

On 28 January, the Tauranga City Council evacuated 150 people from 30 properties near the southern end of Truman Lane in response to a new landslip.

=== Other impacts ===
The Mahurangi River ford one day before a driver and his vehicle were swept away

On 15 January, thunderstorms across the North Island resulted in over 18,000 lightning strikes being recorded between midday and 7am the following day. A tornado damaged homes in Orewa, while another occurred near Ōtorohanga. On 16 January, heavy rain caused landslides in the Waioweka Gorge, trapping travellers and leading to the closure of State Highway 2 between Mātāwai and Waioweka. On 18 January, heavy rain caused flooding, travel disruptions and landslides in parts of the Northland Region, including the Whangarei District, east and south of Kawakawa and the south of the Far North District. The township of Ōakura was cut off after both roads into town were damaged.

On 21 January, 47-year-old Tekanimaeu Arobati, from Kiribati, was reported missing after he and his vehicle were swept away while trying to cross the Mahurangi River near Warkworth. His body was found three days later. Severe weather on 21 and 22 January caused widespread damage across the Gisborne District and the Coromandel Peninsula, with landslides and flooding cutting off access to a number of towns in both areas. The area around Te Araroa was particularly badly affected, with one family spending the night trapped on their roof as floodwaters surrounded their home until they were rescued, and others narrowly escaping landslides at a campsite in Punaruku.

Bad weather continued to impact the east coast of the country over the following days, weakening as it went, affecting areas in both islands with high winds and heavy rainfall. On 23 January, 52-year-old David Roe fell off his boat while crossing the Waioweka River after the local swing bridge had been destroyed by the weather. He was swept downstream, and his body was recovered on 10 February.

== Responses ==
=== Emergency services ===
Police and helicopters evacuated 40 people from the Waioweka Gorge overnight on 16 and 17 January. The Royal New Zealand Air Force rescued 35 people from an East Coast campsite on 16 January, and also assisted in the Mount Maunganui landslide rescue using NH90 helicopters.

By 31 January, Fire and Emergency New Zealand's Urban Search and Rescue (USAR) team and the Disaster Victim Identification team had completed recovery efforts at the Mount Maunganui landslip site. Police also completed identifying the remains of the six landslide victims. On 1 February, Police completed their recovery operations at the Mount Maunganui site.

=== Central government ===
Prime Minister Christopher Luxon pulled out of attending Rātana celebrations to instead visit the impacted areas on 23 January. Luxon said central government agencies stood ready to send funding to councils in impacted areas. He and Minister for Emergency Management Mark Mitchell attended a vigil for the victims of the Mount Maunganui landslide at Blake Park on 25 January.

On 27 January, Luxon announced that the New Zealand Government would provide a NZ$2.2 million relief package to flood-hit regions. This amount included allocating NZ$1.2 million to mayoral relief funds and $1 million to marae that had provided welfare support to displaced communities.

In late March 2026, RNZ reported that Gisborne community leaders were still waiting for the Government to approve a NZ$29.7 million recovery fund for a joint agency/iwi-led recovery plan in response to the January storms.

=== International ===
Australian prime minister Anthony Albanese said that:

'On behalf of the people of Australia, I extend our deepest condolences to the families and loved ones affected by the tragic landslide in Mount Maunganui. We are heartbroken for the families and loved ones of those killed and our thoughts are with all Kiwis at this devastating time. New Zealand and Australia are the closest of friends, and we stand ready to support in any way we can.'

=== Investigations ===
Tauranga mayor Mahé Drysdale confirmed an independent review will take place on the events leading up to the Mount Maunganui landslide. On 2 February, the Tauranga City Council voted to commission an independent external review into the Mount Maunganui landslide. On 17 March, associate Emergency Management and Recovery Minister Chris Penk appointed former Supreme Court Justice Mark O'Regan as the chair of the New Zealand government's inquiry into the Mount Maunganui and Papamoa landslides.

Speculation circulated online about the recent removal of trees on the mountain potentially contributing to the slip, but disaster risk specialist Dr Tom Robinson from the University of Canterbury stated that trees would likely have not prevented a landslide of the depth and scale that occurred. Luxon also pushed back against the speculation, stating “The people on the margins with their rhetoric, they need to just frankly keep it to themselves.”

On 17 June 2026, the Tauranga City Council delayed the release of the independent review from 30 June to the end of July 2026 in order to "to allow sufficient time for all relevant information to be sourced and carefully considered." On 19 August 2026, the City Council released retired High Court Justice Paul Davison's KC independent review into the Mount Maunganui landslide, which concluded that it was a "preventable tragedy." Davison's report found that the Council had ignored several warnings since 1999 that the hill slope had posed a landslide hazard to the camping group, and that the Council had delayed acting on two Trigger Action Response Plans in 2023 and 2025. Mayor of Tauranga Drysdale accepted the independent report's findings and apologised to the families of the deceased for the Council's "failings."

=== Repairs ===
On 17 June 2026, repair works on the Mount Maunganui site was delayed for another month by a new severe slip.

== See also ==
- Weather of 2026
- List of natural disasters in New Zealand
- List of disasters in New Zealand by death toll
- 2026 in New Zealand
