= October 2025 New Zealand storms =

October 2025 Storms
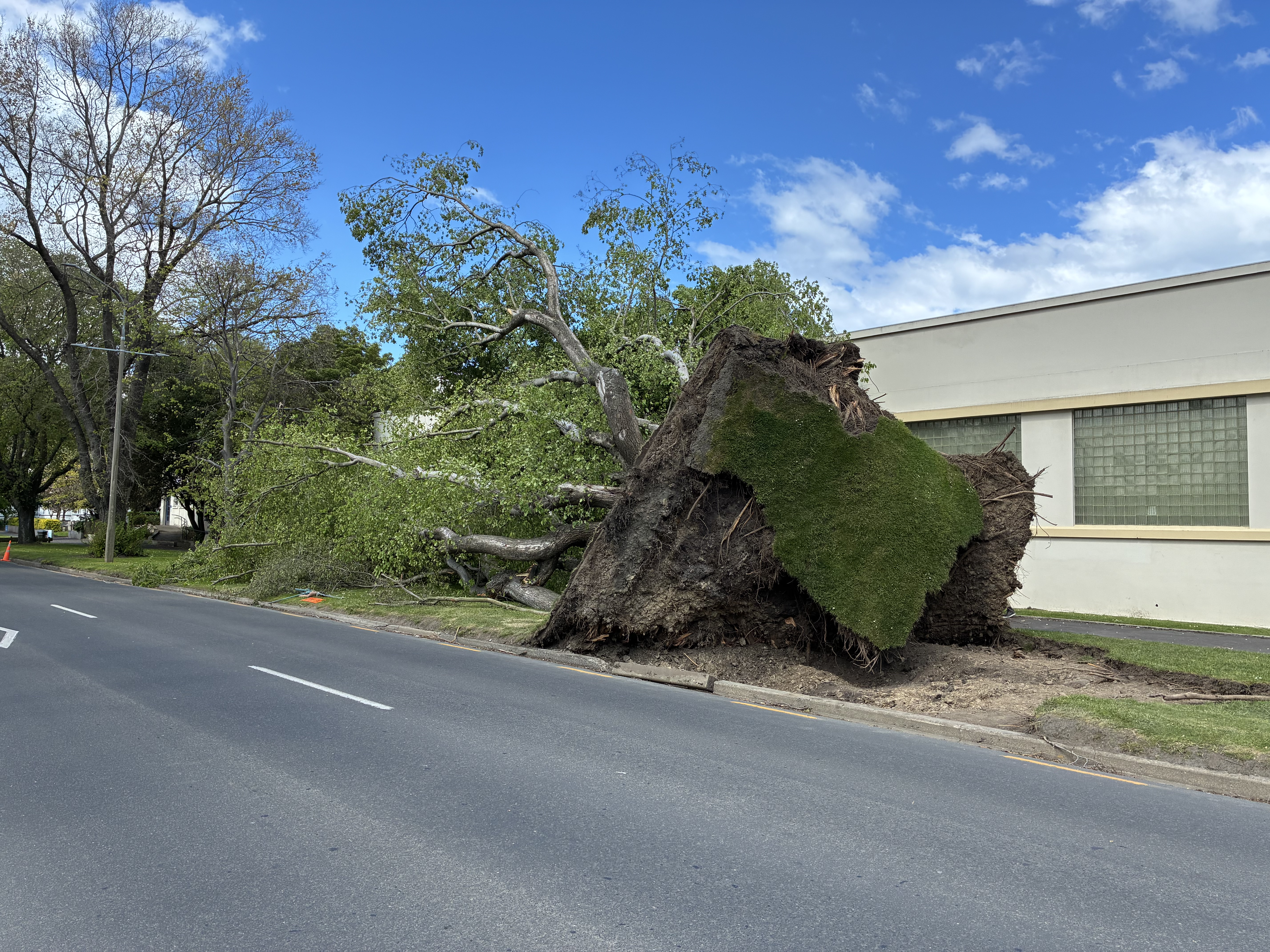
- A fallen tree in Dunedin

Meteorological history
- Duration: 21 to 27 October 2025

Overall effects
- Fatalities: 1
- Damage: 7,000 storm-related insurance claims nationwide; NZ$28 million worth of insurance claims in Southland and Otago. $2.39 million worth of damage to infrastructure and property in Invercargill.
- Areas affected: Hawke's Bay and Wellington Regions, entire South Island

An intense storm with unusually strong winds caused damage and disruption across large parts of Aotearoa/New Zealand from 21 October to 27 October 2025. High winds exacerbated fires and damaged buildings, as well as causing power cuts and water shortages. One person was killed in Wellington by a falling branch. Flows in the Waimakariri and Rakaia rivers in Canterbury exceeded their estimated 1-in-10 year flood levels. The West Coast Region became completely isolated by road following closures of the three mountain passes linking the West Coast to the rest of the South Island. There was extensive damage in the Otago and Southland regions with loss of electricity supply to 65,000 properties and 6,000 still not reconnected one week later.

States of emergency were declared in Canterbury, Southland, and the Clutha District. By 24 October, the state of emergency had been lifted for much of Canterbury except the Kaikoura District. By 7 November, the states of emergency in the Clutha District and Southland had been lifted.

== Meteorology ==
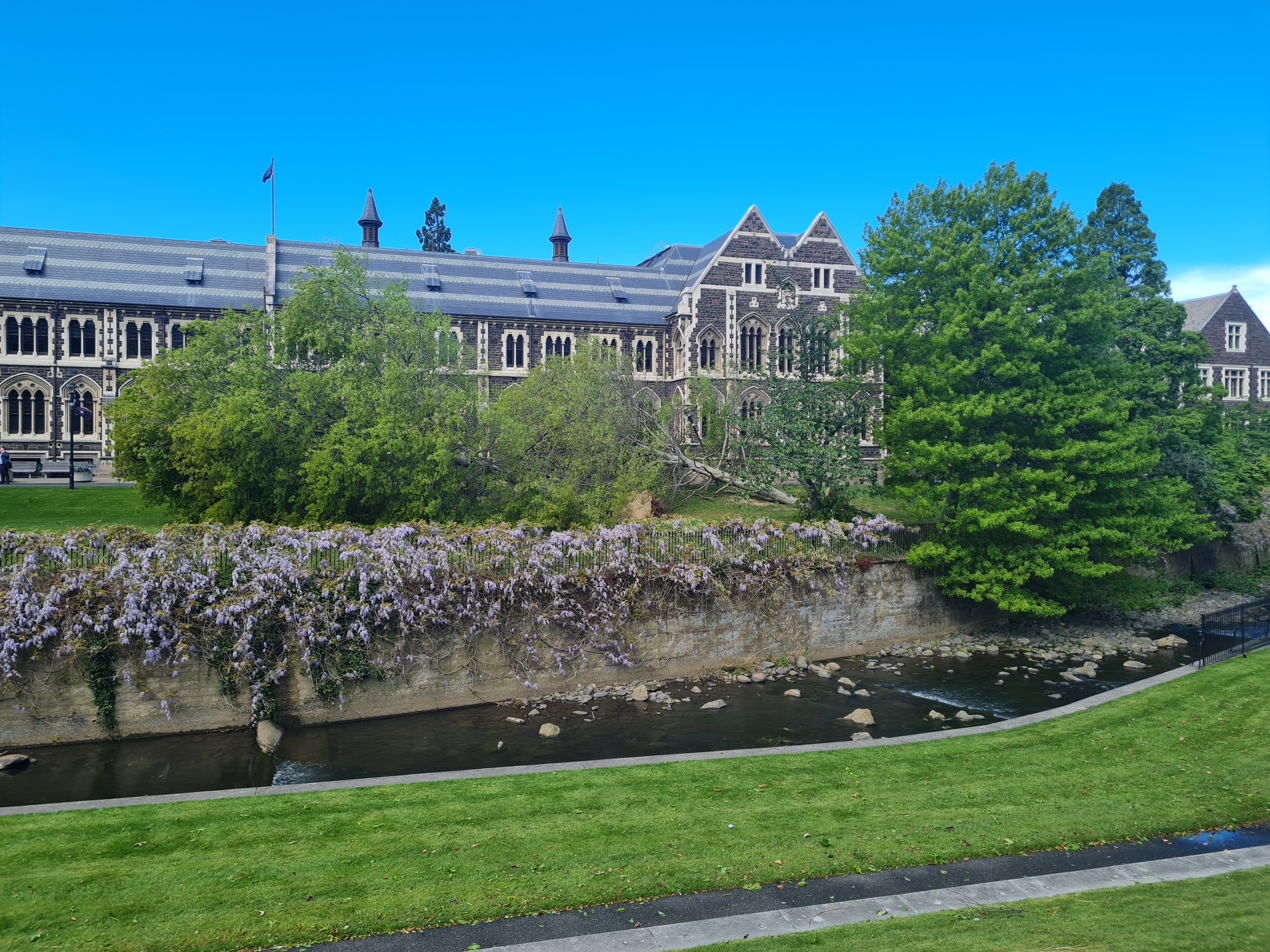
Fallen oak trees, outside of the University of Otago Registry Building, Dunedin.

The buildup to this event started with a large mass of very warm air developing into a high pressure zone over Australia and then moving into the Tasman Sea and on towards New Zealand early in the week. Over the same period, a mass of cold air that sits above Antarctica over winter, known as the Polar vortex, started to break down and fade. This weakening system sent surges of cold air northwards and into the Southern Ocean. The situation leading to the storm was a deep low pressure system passing just south of New Zealand, with an active front extending further south, together with a large high pressure system stationary to the northeast of New Zealand. The difference in pressure over a distance of around 2,800 km (1,700 mi) between 1024 hPa at the centre of the high, and around 950 hPa at the centre of the low, created a steep pressure gradient between the two systems, leading to high wind speeds. The intensity of the storm was increased by the difference in temperatures of air masses to the north and south of the country.

On 23 October, MetService issued red warnings for severe wind for Wellington and Christchurch, and forecast that gusts might reach 150 km/h (93 mph). In the Wellington region, by 8:00 am peak wind gusts of 142 km/h (88 mph) were recorded at Mount Kaukau, with 139 km/h (86 mph) at the Remutaka Summit, and 109 km/h (68 mph) in the Wellington suburb of Kelburn. Later in the morning gusts of 155 km/h (96 mph) were recorded at Mount Kaukau. In the South Island, wind speeds of 141 km/h (88 mph) were recorded in Methven, in mid-Canterbury, and up to 137 km/h (85 mph) at Sugarloaf above Christchurch.

A further storm was forecast for Labour Day, with severe wind and heavy rain warnings issued across much of the country. A heavy snow warning was issued for the Queenstown Lakes District, Central Otago and the Canterbury High Country.

== Hawke's Bay and Lower North Island ==
On the morning of 21 October, MetService issued orange strong wind warnings for the Hawke's Bay and the lower North Island. Strong northwesterly gales toppled vehicles travelling on State Highway 2 and State Highway 50, damaged and destroyed roofs, fences and in Dannevirke and Norsewood, and caused power outages to nearly 1,000 properties in the Hastings District and the Central Hawke's Bay District.

On 21 October about five vegetation fires broke out in the Hawke's Bay. The largest, in Pōrangahau, covered an estimated area of 30 hectares (74 acres) in the evening of that day.

== Wellington Region ==
On 21 October a man died after being hit by a falling branch in Mount Victoria in Wellington. The Wellington City Council "strongly urged" people to keep away from the city's parks and reserves due to the risk of falling trees or branches. The wildlife sanctuary Zealandia was closed. Several buildings were damaged across the region as well.

From 8 am on 23 October, a red wind warning was in place for Wellington and parts of the Wairarapa. All of the city council's facilities were closed, including libraries and Wellington Zoo. Victoria University of Wellington was closed and in-person examinations were postponed, and a New Zealand Symphony Orchestra concert was cancelled. The council's Emergency Operations Centre was activated.

== Canterbury and the Upper South Island ==
On 20 October, strong gale force winds caused a large truck's trailer to roll over, blocking multiple lanes on State Highway 8 between Lake Tekapo and Lake Pukaki. Gusty winds exceeding 140km/h were also recorded in the Mackenzie Country. MetService also forecast strong winds in Canterbury High Country and the foothills of the Canterbury Plains.

On 21 October, several fires started in the northern Kaikōura District. While it is not known what caused the fires, the winds caused them to spread. A peak of 50 fire appliances and 120 personnel were fighting the fires. The fires caused several highways around Kaikōura including State Highway 1 to temporarily close. By the early afternoon 22 October 14 rural buildings had burnt down, including five homes. An emergency operations centre was set up in the Kaikōura Fire Station.

On 23 October, several parks were closed in Christchurch, including but not limited to the Christchurch Botanic Gardens and Mona Vale. A lightning strike knocked out Methven's water treatment plant. The closure of State Highway 7 due to fallen trees caused difficulty for firefighters to reach a fire in Hanmer Springs on 23 October.

In response to the rising flood levels in the Waimakariri River, at 6:00pm on 23 October, the Waimakariri District Council issued a voluntary evacuation notice for residents of Kairaki, a small coastal settlement to the north of the Waimakariri River mouth, because of a predicted risk to the Kairaki Beach stopbank at around 11:00pm that evening. The notice also advised residents of The Pines Beach to prepare for the possibility of requiring a prompt evacuation. The trigger for the voluntary evacuation notice was a predicted flow of 2,500 cumecs. The peak flow recorded was 2,700 cumecs, significantly exceeding the 1-in-10 year flood estimate of 2,270 cumecs, but the time of peak flow coincided with low tide. The evacuation notices were withdrawn by 9:30am on 24 October.

The flood levels in the Rakaia River as measured at Fighting Hill reached 4,975 cumecs, exceeding the 1-in-10 year flood estimate of 4,040 cumecs. Environment Canterbury issued a voluntary evacuation advisory for areas adjacent to the river downstream of State Highway 1, including the South and North Rakaia Huts. The advisory was lifted by 9:00am on 24 October.

== West Coast ==
The West Coast had previously suffering heavy rains and flooding when the storms came through further dampening recovery efforts. On 23 October a lightning strike knocked out Greymouth's water treatment plant, causing water shortages in Greymouth and surrounding communities. Schools were closed.

The entire West Coast Region was without power for four hours on the morning of 23 October. The West Coast also became isolated by road after slips, debris and flooding caused closures of the Lewis Pass, Arthurs Pass and Haast Pass routes between the West Coast and the rest of the South Island. State Highway 6 was also closed between Murchison and Kawatiri Junction.

== Otago ==
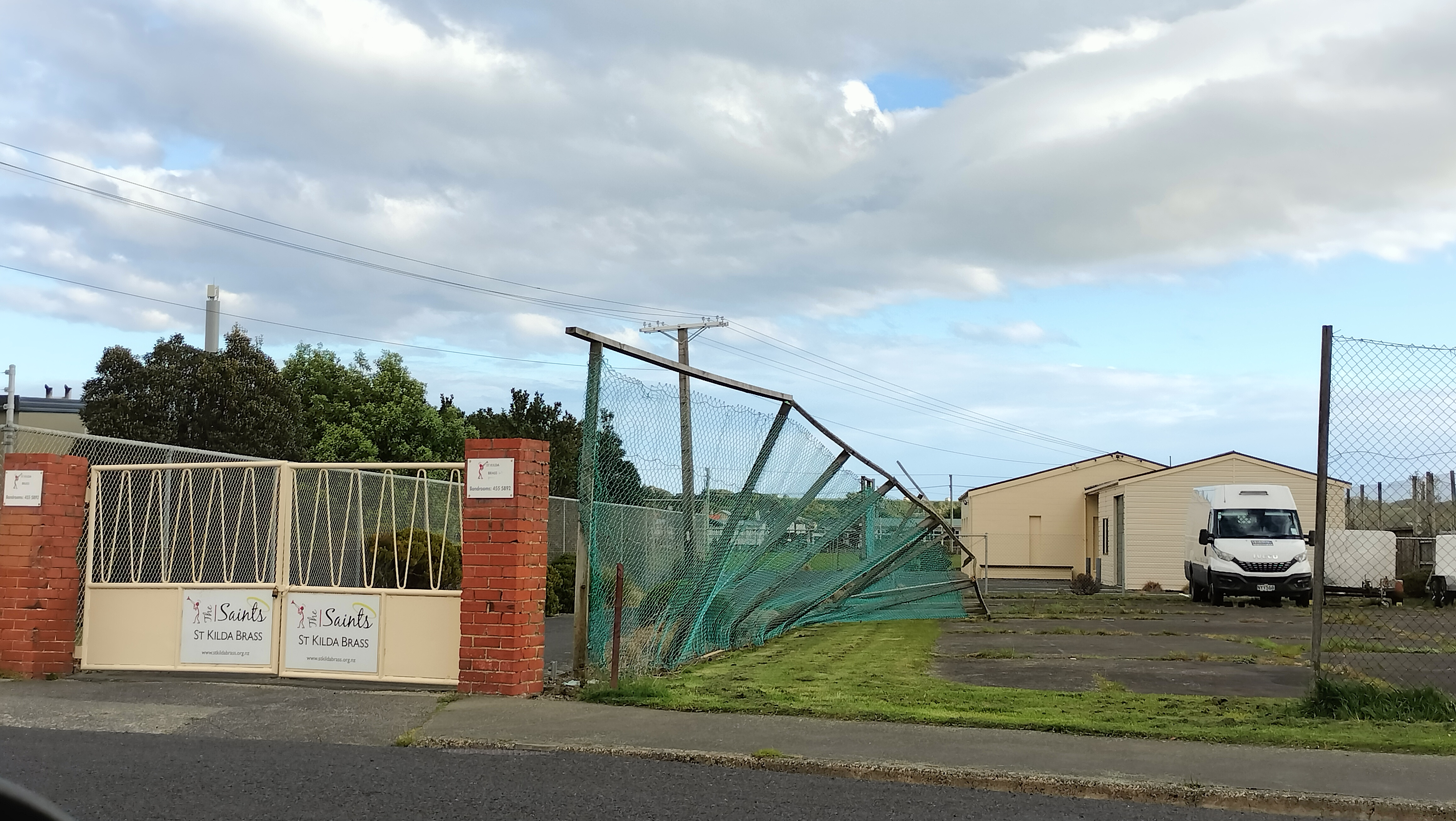
A damaged fence in Saint Kilda, Dunedin.

Strong winds on 21 October collapsed a shed in Mosgiel and cut power throughout the Dunedin area. High winds on 23 October, gusting up to 170 km/h at Taiaroa Head, caused further widespread damage.

Following the high winds on 23 October, over 100 slates were ripped off the roof of Knox Church, and roof damage was also reported at Otago Badminton Centre, Dunedin Ice Stadium, Forbury Park, Forsyth Barr Stadium and Dunedin railway station. Two trees next to the Hocken Collections in Dunedin were toppled during the 23 October winds, following two trees blown over on the 20th, fracturing a water main. The trees formed part of the Anzac Avenue memorial to World War I soldiers.

The storm front arriving at Balclutha on State Highway 1, around midday on 23 October 2025

== Southland ==
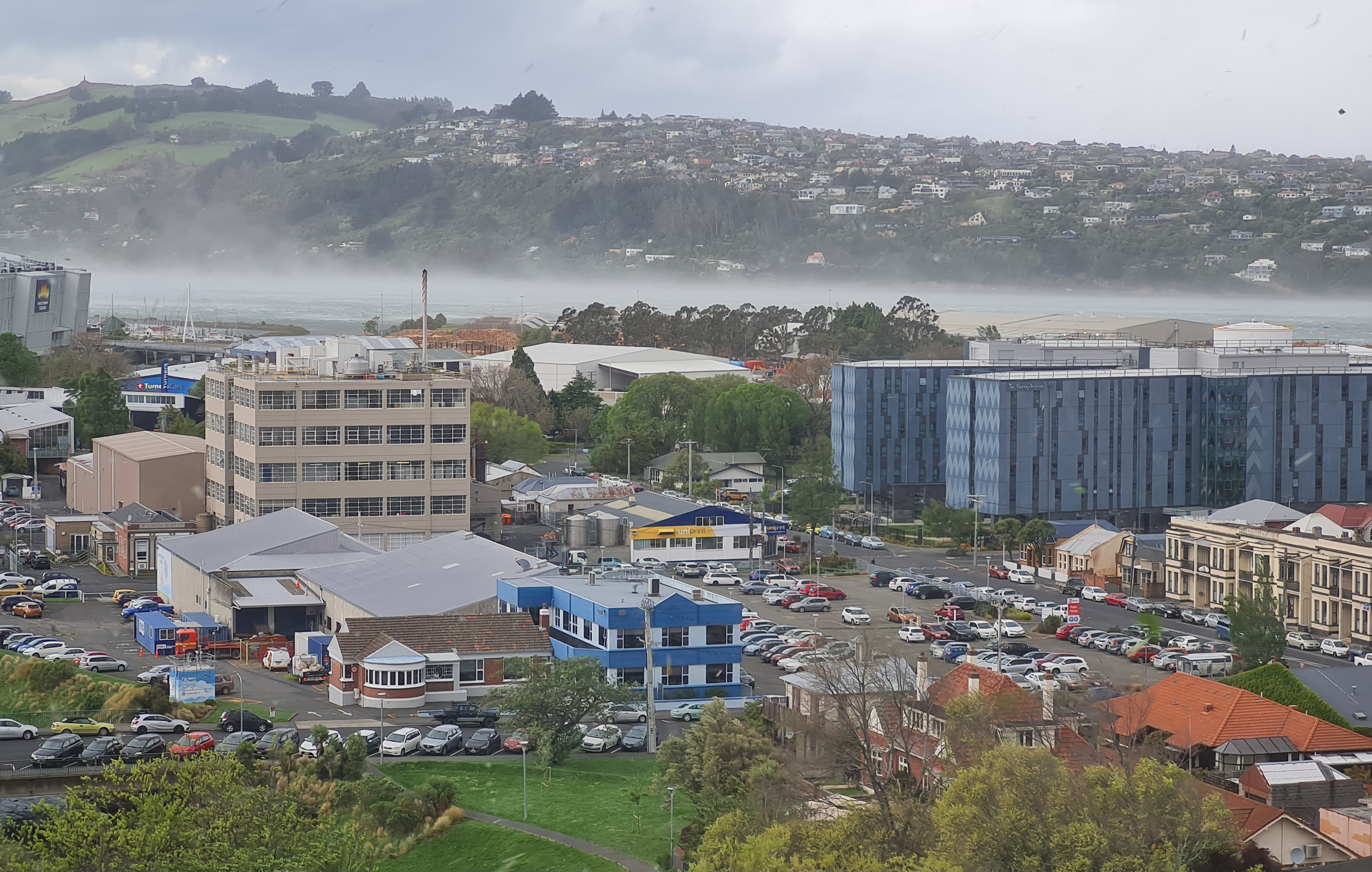
Wind-blown spray on the Otago Harbour during extreme wind gusts

Riverton and Invercargill were also affected by wind on 21 October, with significant damage at Ascot Park Raceway. Invercargill and Gore were hit by strong north-westerly winds around midday on 23 October, resulting in over 100 FENZ callouts in Invercargill and damage throughout the Southland region.

Treefalls, slips, and flood-damage closed the Milford Road.

Damage to the distribution network in Southland and Otago left 25,000 homes without power, with some expected to be without power for a week. According to the Otago Daily Times, an estimated total of 65,000 properties in Otago and Southland lost power during the storm on 23 October. As of 30 October, there were still 6,000 properties in Clutha and Southland that had not yet been reconnected.

22 cellphone towers in Southland were also knocked out by wind damage on 23 October, disrupted phone services throughout the region. On 24 October, Southland Federated Farmers President Jason Herrick reported that power outages had disrupted the local dairy industry. While some dairy farmers had emergency power generators, there was a limited supply. Federated Farmers also confirmed it was liaising with a generator supplier, the central government and Member of Parliament for Southland Joseph Mooney to obtain spare generators from the North Island.

== Impact ==
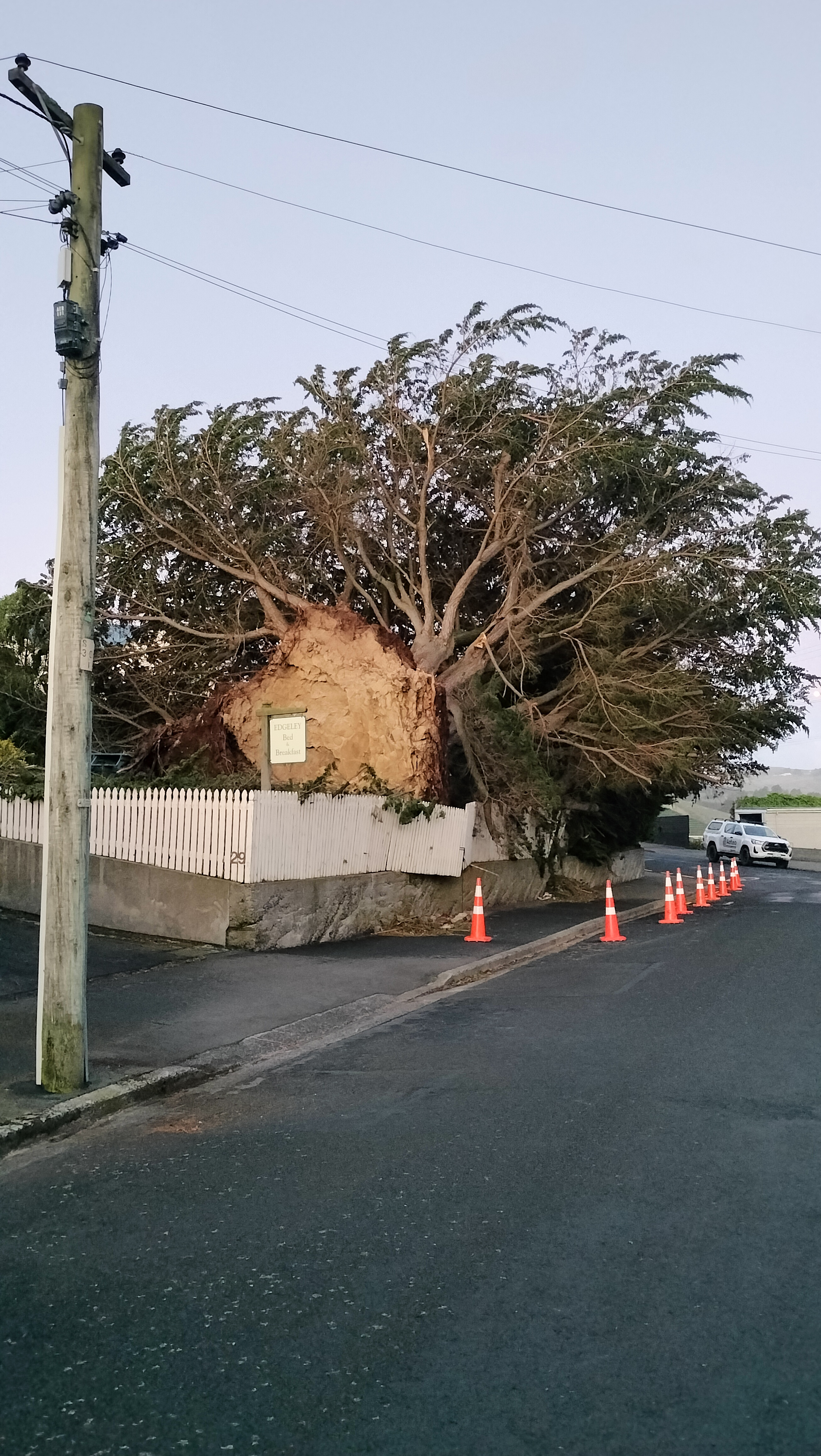
A fallen monterey cypress tree in Anderson Bay, Dunedin

As of 28 October FMG Insurance has received over $10 million worth of insurance claims, about half of which were from Southland and Otago.

=== Agriculture ===
On 25 October, the Otago Regional Council (ORC) allowed farmers with full effluent pools and who needed to irrigate wet soil to release them into paddocks on the condition that they did not flow into title drains or waterways. The ORC also allowed dairy farmers to discharge milk into effluent storage facilities or onto land on the condition that it did not contaminate drains or waterways. The Council also suspended dairy farm inspections until 3 November.

Power disruptions caused several farmers to dump milk due to the inability to refrigerate milk. On 27 October, RNZ reported that 200 dairy farms across Southland were relying on power generators to milk their cows. Farmers shared power generators among their neighbours. Following the windstorm on 23 October, the Rural Support Trust focused on animal welfare by allocating generators to dairy farms. The Trust also established five welfare centres to provide moral support to farmers.

On 3 November, Rural Women NZ South Island national board member Sharron Davie-Martin said that the Southland region faced a "long road to recovery." Several farms faced damage including the destruction of milking sheds, hay barns and staff houses. The charity activated its Adverse Events Relief Fund to provide support to farmers affected by the storms including food supplies, counselling and organising barbeques.

=== Economic impact ===
By 29 October, the New Zealand insurance companies AMI Insurance, State Insurance and NZI had received over 3,300 claims covering home, contents, motor and commercial policies. The majority of these claims were linked to wind damage in Southland, Otago, Canterbury and Wellington including broken windows, damaged roofs and fallen trees. According to Insurance Business New Zealand, Southland accounted for 1,129 claims, Otago for 615, Canterbury for 481, and Wellington for 504, with other regions comprising 566 claims. Notable insurance claims included eight claims linked to the Whangarei Hospital fire and four claims connected to the Kaikoura fire.

By 20 November, 7,000 insurance claims for storm-related damaged had been filed in the South Island. FMG Insurance received over 3,000 insurance claims (1,500 in Southland and 700 in Otago) related to wind damage, amounting to about NZ$28 million. On 22 November, the Invercargill City Council reported that it had sustained a total of $2.39 million worth of damage to infrastructure and property in Invercargill including parks, reserves, elderly housing, roads, fallen trees, damaged cars and aerials.

In December, Wenita Forest Products chief executive David Cormack said that the windstorm on 23 October had caused about 250-300 hectares worth of damage to the companies' forests in Berwick and the Otago Coast. Cormack estimated the damage to be in the hundreds of thousands in New Zealand dollars, and said it would take at least until mid-2026 to clear the fallen trees and vegetation.

In January 2026 FMG Insurance announced that the storm had resulted in $50 million of paid claims - the second highest in its history.

=== Energy and power outages ===
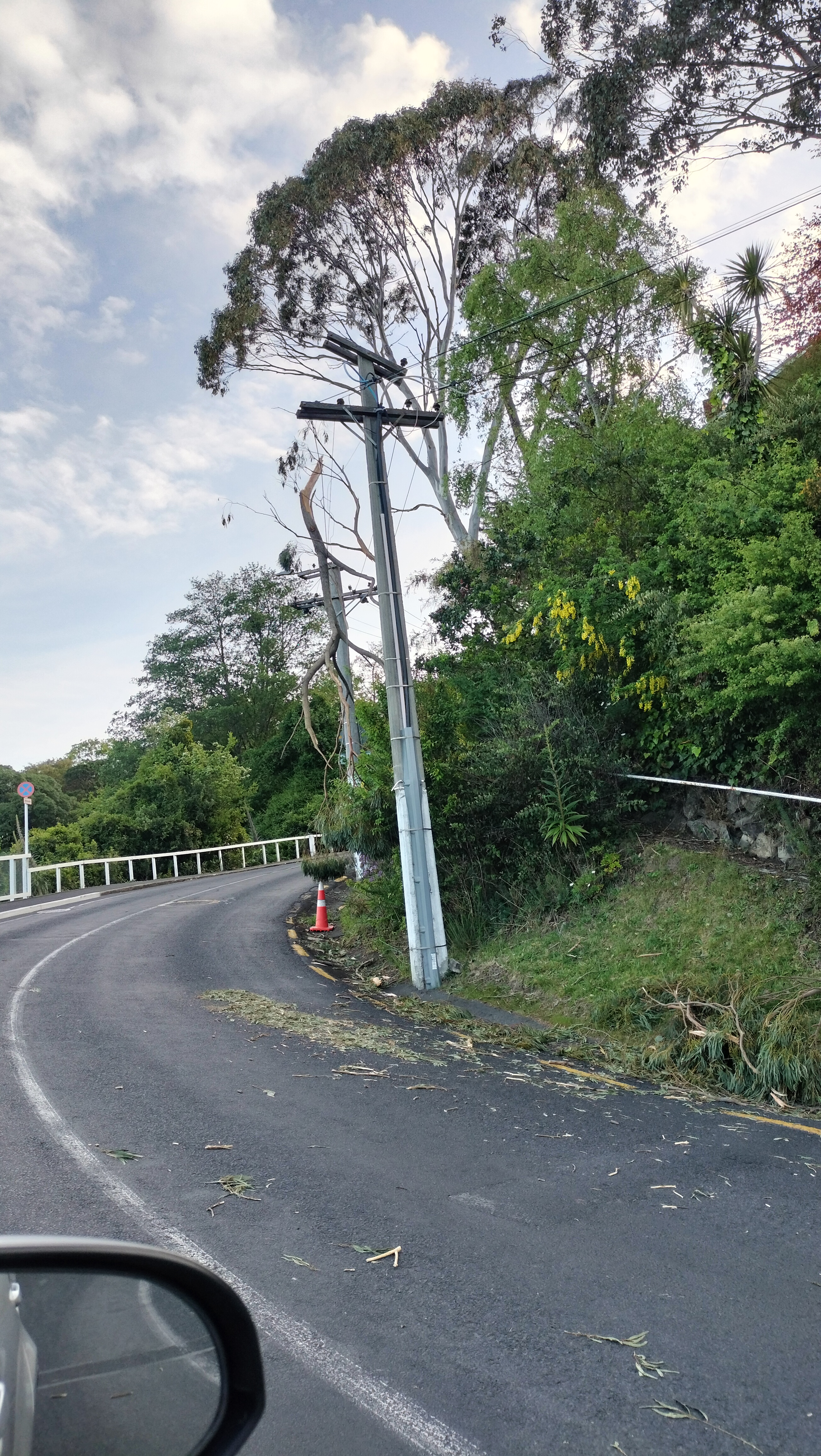
A fallen branch hanging on a powerline in Saint Clair, Dunedin

On 21 October, strong winds caused widespread power outages and fallen trees in Wairarapa. 10,000 properties lost power. Metlink also closed the route 200 bus service and all school buses due to the turbulent weather.

On the morning of 23 October, 90,000 homes in the South Island lost power after strong winds damaged three major circuits, the first overnight and the last at 7:45 am. The Press reported that a backup generator at Nelson Hospital had failed. By 9:45 am, power was back in Kaikōura, Culverden and Stoke. Before 10:40 am, power was restored to Greymouth and Blenheim. In Hanmer Springs, a power outage on 23 October affected about 1600 people.

Storm damage on 23 October cut power to an estimated 66,000 properties across Otago and Southland; with PowerNet estimating that 50,000 properties in Southland had lost power while Aurora Energy estimating that 16,000 properties in Otago had lost power. On 24 October, the Invercargill City Council, Southland District Council and the power company PowerNet confirmed they were working to reopen roads and restore power utilities and lines. In addition, 130 cellphone towers across Otago and Southland had been damaged by the windstorm.

By 25 October, power had been restored to 10,000 homes in Southland while 15,000 homes remained without power. By 26 October, PowerNet had restored power to about 40,500 customers in Southland, with 9,500 customers remaining without power. By the morning of 27 October, PowerNet estimated there were still 9,500 customers without power. That same day, EMS confirmed it was moving 31 power generators around the region to support critical infrastructure, dairy sheds and community hubs. Fire and Emergency New Zealand also shared some power generators. By the evening of 28 October an estimated 5,500 properties in the South Island were still without power.

By 1 November, only about 2,200 PowerNet customers remained without power in the Southland region. According to PowerNet's team leader Rob Wylie, repair teams had spent 15 hours each day working to restore power lines, with work complicated by the extensive damage and water pooling along roadsides. By 3 November, PowerNet said that the number of customers facing outages in Otago and Southland had dropped to 2,000. By 5 November, the number of properties facing outages in Otago and Southland had dropped to 115. By 7 November, only 65 PowerNet customers in Clutha and Southland remained without power. By 13 November, PowerNet chief executive Paul Blue confirmed that only a handful of customers in the Southern region remained without power.

According to PowerNet, damaged powerlines caused by fallen trees accounted for 85% of power outages in Otago and Southland on 23 October, amounting to 25,000 disconnections. In response, Electricity Networks Aotearoa chief executive Tracey Kai called on the Government to introduce legislation requiring tree owners including local government bodies and private owners to trim their trees.

In response to misinformation about fuel scarcity, Environment Management Southland (EMS) clarified on 26 October that the Southland region had sufficient supplies of fuel. As of 25 October, five percent of the nearly 200 retail fuel sites in Southland and Otago had no power.

=== Transport ===
On 21 October, Air New Zealand postponed or cancelled all of its Wellington flights until 1 pm. On 23 October, ninety per cent of Air New Zealand's flights until 10 am were cancelled and all of Jetstar's Christchurch flights until 4 pm were cancelled. At 9:30 am on 23 October, Flightradar24 reported that there were only two flights taking place above the upper South Island and central and lower North Island. One DHL flight in the morning was the most tracked plane on the service in the world at one point. Many Dunedin and Queenstown flights were cancelled on 23 October. In total, over 200 flights on 23 October were cancelled.

On 23 October, all trains in and out of Wellington from 8 am to 6 pm were cancelled. Replacement buses were offered for the Kāpiti and Hutt Valley Lines but not for the Johnsonville or Melling branch lines. All of the Wairarapa's bus services on the 200 route were cancelled. The 23 October storm also disrupted the railway network in Otago and Southland.

All three mountain passes Lewis Pass, Arthurs Pass and Haast Pass that provide road access between the West Coast and the rest of the South Island were closed by slips, debris and flooding. The Remutaka Hill road linking the Hutt Valley to the Wairapapa was also closed all day on 23 October.

By 26 October, the Southland rail network was largely operational apart from the Woodlands, Longbush, Rimu Road and Steel Road railway crossings near Invercargill. On 27 October over 50 Wellington flights were cancelled due to wind and several state highways in Otago were closed due to snow.

== Responses ==
At 3 pm on 22 October, the Minister of Emergency Management and Recovery Mark Mitchell declared a state of local emergency for Canterbury. It was lifted the following day at 5:40 pm, except for Kaikōura.

In the morning of 24 October, Mitchell declared a state of local emergency for Southland. Emergency Management Southland controller Lucy Hicks said that the states of emergency were expected to continue into the following week.

On 24 October, the Clutha District Council declared a state of emergency in the Clutha District. Due to damage to local water networks, a boil water notice was issued for the district. The New Zealand Defence Force (NZDF) also deployed personnel in the Clutha District to conduct welfare checks. That same day, the local state of emergency was lifted for much of Canterbury except the Kaikoura District.

On 25 October a Royal New Zealand Air Force C-130J Hercules was used to ferry civil defence staff and 40 portable generators to Southland. These included 20 portable generators and three-trailer mounted generators, with priority being given to rural areas.

On 27 October, the Government donated a total NZ$150,000 to mayoral relief funds in Southland and Clutha District to assist with post-storm damage; with Southland receiving NZ$100,000 and Clutha NZ$50,000. In response, an Inch Clutha farmer named Donna Weir described the government's emergency relief funds as insufficient, citing the devastating economic impact of the storm on farmers including milk dumping due to a lack of refrigeration.

On 3 November, RNZ reported that several Airbnb owners had temporarily opened their properties to community members whose homes had lost power, allowing them to recharge their phones, shower, cook and rest.

By 7 November, the Clutha District and Southland local authorities had lifted their local states of emergency.
