= 2024 East Coast floods =

Natural disaster in New Zealand

In late June 2024, torrential rain led to flooding in the North Island's East Coast regions of Hawke's Bay and the Gisborne District. This flooding led to evacuations and local states of emergency being declared in Hastings and Wairoa. 400 properties were flooded in Wairoa. In response, Emergency Management and Recovery Minister Mark Mitchell announced that the New Zealand Government would contribute $300,000 to mayoral relief funds in Hastings, Wairoa and the Gisborne District. According to Mayor of Wairoa Craig Little, Wairoa sustained a loss of NZ$40 million (US$24.3 million).

== Background ==
In February 2023, the Hawke's Bay region had been devastated by Cyclone Gabrielle, with flooding causing significant damage to land and property. Significant areas of land were rendered unsafe for human habitation. In 2023, the New Zealand Government passed the short-term Severe Weather Emergency Recovery Legislation Act 2023 (SWERLA) to speed up flood protection works in the regions. These flood protection works included the development of new stop banks, culverts, retaining walls, bridge works, pump stations, stream alignments and earthworks to protect homes and properties from future flood events. Areas affected by flooding during Cyclone Gabrielle included Wairoa, Whirinaki, Waiohiki, Ohiti Road/Omahu, Pakowhai, Havelock North, Pōrangahau and Awatoto. The Hawke’s Bay Regional Recovery Plan, which was linked to SWERLA, came into effect on 7 June 2024.

== Flood event ==
On 25 June 2024, MetService issued a severe weather update, warning that a deep low weather system to the northeast of the North Island was expected to bring heavy rains and large easterly swells to Hawke's Bay and the Gisborne district on the east coast. In response, orange heavy rain warnings were issued for Gisborne and Hawke's Bay from Tuesday to Wednesday. In addition, the National Institute of Water and Atmospheric Research (NIWA) issued heavy rain warnings for Gisborne and Hawke's Bay.

On 26 June, heavy rain and high tides led to flooding in Wairoa, affecting 400 properties with 100 being "significantly" damaged. Local Civil Defence authorities expressed concern that high tide at 9pm could lead to more flooding. About 200 households were also evacuated in the Hawke's Bay town of Haumoana while 700 people were evacuated from the Gisborne township of Te Karaka. Local state of emergencies were declared in Wairoa and the Heretaunga Ward due to rising river levels and coastal inundation respectively. Mayor of Wairoa Craig Little estimated that about 200 mm of rain had fallen over a 24-hour period in some parts of the East Coast, exceeding meteorological forecasts. In response to flooding in Wairoa, 115 local residents were evacuated.

A combination of an extremely high easterly swell, high tide and a rain-swollen river caused the river to overflow into parts of lower Wairoa, inundating dozens of properties in knee-high water for up to three blocks inland. As a result of heavy rain, the Hawke's Bay Regional Council was forced to suspend efforts to open the Wairoa river. High tide also damaged properties and infrastructure further south on the Cape Coast. Police advised local residents to evacuate.

Several roads in Hawke's Bay including State Highway 2 between Pūtōrino and Wairoa, Mitchell Road to Kiwi Valley Road, State Highway 38 between Frasertown and Lake Waikaremoana, and the State Highway 51 Waitangi Bridge near Awatoto were closed on 26 June due to flooding, slips and debris. By the evening of 26 June, most of these roads except State Highway 38 had reopened under traffic management. Despite the overnight rain, Waka Kotahi confirmed that the state highways connecting Napier, Wairoa and Gisborne had remained opened on 26 June.

== Impact ==
In response to flooding near local power substations in Wairoa, power was temporarily suspended. By mid-afternoon 26 June, power company Firstlight Network confirmed it had restored power to 1,115 customers and that it was also dealing with widespread outages from the south of Wairoa to Te Araroa. Sandbagging occurred in the town's main street.

On the morning of 27 June, MetService lifted all weather warnings for Hawke's Bay. By 12:04 PM, the local state of emergency in Haumoana had been lifted following the high tide. Four homes were issued with yellow placards, restricting accessibility. The local state of emergency remained in place at Wairoa. Local authorities conducted 400 wide area assessments, with 116 properties sustaining flood damage amounting to NZ$150,000. Six houses were majorly impacted while 72 houses sustained minor damage. Vehicles, sheds and garages in Wairoa were also inundated.

Flooding caused power outages stretching from the south of Wairoa to Te Araroa, affecting over 2000 customers. By the afternoon of 27 June, Firstlight had succeeded in restoring power to most areas, with 550 still without power in some areas of Wairoa and Gisborne. Following an inspection, the Wairoa substation was returned to service. The 2024 East Coast flooding complicated a housing crisis in Wairoa's North Clyde area, where 200 homes had been rendered unlivable following Cyclone Gabrielle.

According to Civil Defence, 118 homes in Wairoa were inundated by flooding. According to the Treaty of Waitangi settlement governance entity Tātau Tātau's chief executive Lewis Ratapu, several displaced families were residing at Mahia Holiday Park. Tātau Tātau had bought the holiday park earlier in the year.

By 2 July, nearly 500 homes in the Hawke's Bay region had been damaged by flooding, with over 100 rendered uninhabitable. Psychologist Amber Logan said that people who had suffered post-traumatic stress disorder following Cyclone Gabrielle would be re-traumatised by the 2024 East Coast floods.

== Responses ==
=== Disaster relief ===
On 26 June, Emergency Management Minister Mark Mitchell visited Wairoa to offer central government support to local council and emergency staff. While visiting Haumoana, Mitchell confirmed that the Government would contribute NZ$300,000 to Mayoral Relief Funds to assist with disaster relief efforts in Hastings, Wairoa and Gisborne. The following day, Mitchell attended a press conference in flood-devastated Wairoa where he reiterated that the Government would contribute NZ$100,000 to the town's mayoral relief.

On 28 June, a team of volunteers from disaster relief charity Taskforce Kiwi arrived in Wairoa to assist with recovery efforts including delivering firewood.

On 30 June, mayor of Wairoa Craig Little estimated the cost of the flooding could be NZ$40 million (US$24.3 million), and the town cannot afford it. On 2 July, Prime Minister Christopher Luxon announced plans to visit Wairoa and invest money in assisting flood recovery efforts. On 3 July, Mitchell announced that the Government would contribute another NZ$500,000 to the Wairoa Mayoral Relief Fund. On 6 July, Luxon visited Wairoa and announced that the Government would contributed NZ$3 million to flood recovery efforts in Wairoa.

=== Criticism of HBRC's flood mitigation work ===
On 27 June, Mayor of Wairoa Craig Little criticised the Hawke's Bay Regional Council (HBRC) for not moving earlier to clear the Wairoa River mouth before the storm, resulting in the lower part of the town flooding. On 21 June, the HBRC had put contractors on stand-by to work on the Wairoa River bar, a raised area of sediment in the river mouth. However, contractors did not being work on clearing sediment until 25 June. Little also criticised the HBRC for not listening to community warnings earlier. In response to criticism, HBRC group manager of asset management Chris Dolley and Council chairperson Hinewai Ormsby said that the HBRC had made their decision based on information available at the time. Contractors Pryde had mobilised equipment to the site on 24 June and commenced work on 25 June. Following damage to two diggers and a bulldozer on 25 June, contractors suspended work to open the river mouth on the morning of 26 June.

On 2 July, the HBRC commissioned an independent review into its decision not to open the Wairoa River mouth sooner. Chief executive Dr Nic Peet said that the review would look at the cause of the flooding, operating procedures for the river mouth openings, and timelines associated with the flood event. The review is expected not to be made public.

On 3 July, the New Zealand Government confirmed it would launch an urgent review into Wairoa's flood response and whether local councils could have acted to prevent thousands losing power and the evacuation of hundreds of homes. On 12 July, The New Zealand Herald reported that the Government's urgent review would cover the Hawke's Bay Regional Council's management of the Wairoa river bar following "significant" concerns raised by the local community.

On 11 September, Mike Bush's urgent review was released. The report concluded that the Hawke's Bay Regional Council lacked a proper plan for managing the river mouth and failed to listen to local concerns prior to the heavy rain forecast in late June. Other problems identified in Bush's report included the lack of a formal contract with contractors to open the river bar; the Council's insufficient relationship with local leaders, iwi (tribes) and the community to aid with decision-making; the Council's lack of a proactive preventive approach to addressing "worst case scenarios"; and the Council's reliance on inferior MetService forecasts over the more accurate NIWA forecasts.
