= 2022 New Zealand floods =

August 2022 nationwide flooding of New Zealand

- Date: 18–21 August 2022
- Location: Nationwide
- Property damage: NZ$67.8 million (US$41.8 million)

The 2022 New Zealand floods occurred between 18 and 21 August 2022 in both the North and South Island. Effects of the flooding included landslides, damaged homes and roads, including highway blockages due to fallen trees and floodwater. Over 500 households were evacuated. The cause of the high amount of rainfall has been attributed to an atmospheric river. The estimated insurance loss of the flood was NZ$67.8 million (US$41.8 million).

== History ==
=== 18 August ===
On the third day, 230 homes in Nelson had been evacuated. Emergency minister Kieran McAnulty pledged $200,000 to help communities affected by the flooding via a mayoral relief fund. A sailboat had near Auckland, and there was a slipped home in Tāhunanui. Between Tuesday and Friday of the flooding, Nelson experienced 172 mm (6.8 in) of rain, more than twice the August monthly average rainfall of 80 mm (3.1 in). During that same period, Paradise Peak had experienced 795 mm (31.3 in) of rain, and Dawson Falls recorded over one metre (3 ft 3 in). Within 24 hours, parts of the South Island had over 300 mm (12 in) of rain. Between Tuesday and Thursday, Nelson had 106 mm (4.2 in) of rain.

=== 19 August ===
On the fourth day, the total number of evacuations in Nelson reached 411 households, a displacement of 1,200 people. In Waitara, school children were sent home in the case that a bridge of the town closes, which would leave families split on each side of the river. Parts of the Marlborough Sounds had been cut off.

=== 20 August ===
On 20 August, the total number of evacuations reached 570. This was an increase of 100 overnight in Nelson and Tasman. The rain had stopped in Nelson, and some people were allowed back into their homes. The water levels of the Waimea and Wairoa Rivers begun to lower, although the Maitai River had risen overnight. Residents of Richmond were evacuated from their homes after a creek burst its banks. A part of State Highway 6 in Atawhai and Hira was opened for two hours to allow residents in to leave the area. State Highway 60 between Appleby and Richmond was closed. and State Highway 63 was also closed. The road between Takaka hill and Collingwood was blocked due to a slip on Birds Hill. There were also road closures in Marlborough. Collingwood lost phone, cellphone, and internet coverage. Nelson airport temporarily closed in Nelson due to flooding, but it had reopened by 8am. At 10:30am MetService removed all weather warnings and watches except for a weather watch in Fiordland. Residents of Marlborough and Redwood Valley were asked to conserve water. Marlborough had a leak in their potable water supply. The Nelson water treatment plant's water supply had been damaged, so residents were urged to conserve water.

== Aftermath ==
In October 2022, it was reported by the Insurance Council that there were 3,165 weather-related claims in August, reaching $48 million. Of this, 1,917 claims, valued $22 million, were made in the Nelson and Tasman districts.

A year after the flooding, in August 2023, the New Zealand government and the Nelson Council, decided to buy out 14 homes that became unlivable due to the flooding. The total cost was around $12 million, where the New Zealand government paid half. The Nelson Council will vote on whether they will pay the other half in on 14 September.

Over 40 locations in the country had record or near-record levels in rainfall for the 2022 Winter.
