= FMG Insurance =

New Zealand mutual insurance company

FMG

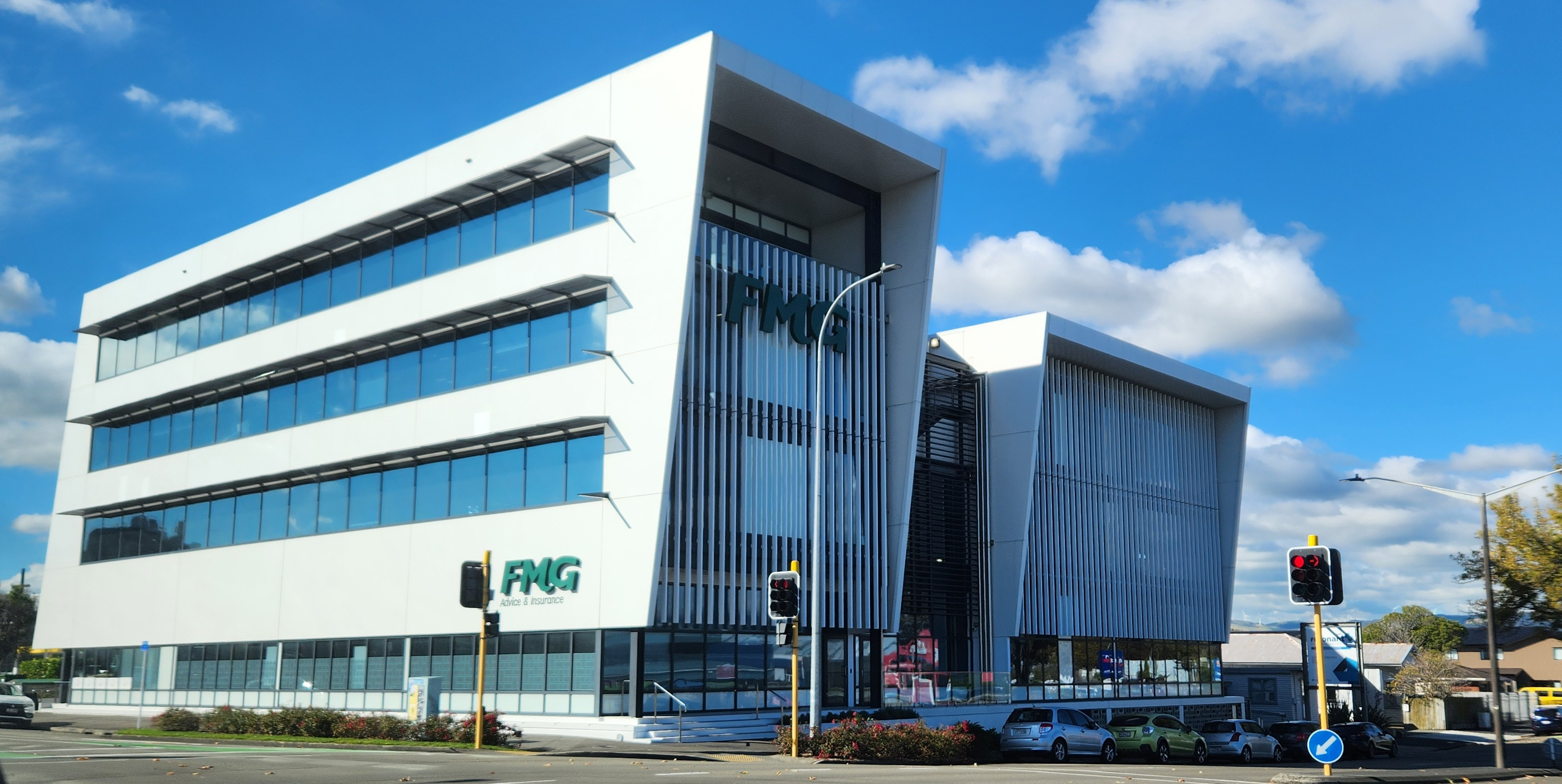
- FMG building in Palmerston North, 2026
- Company type: Mutual
- Industry: Finance and insurance
- Founded: 1978 – Farmers' Mutual Group formed from 1905 – Otago Farmers' Union Mutual Fire Insurance Association 1905 – Taranaki Farmers' Mutual Fire Insurance Association 1905 – Wellington Farmers' Union Mutual Fire Insurance Association 1905 – Hawke's Bay Farmers' Mutual Fire Insurance Association 1937 – Dairy Industry Insurance Agency Limited
- Headquarters: Wellington, New Zealand
- Key people: Adam Heath (CEO)
- Products: Insurance
- Website: www.fmg.co.nz

FMG Insurance (formerly Farmers' Mutual Group) is a mutual insurance company in New Zealand that was established from a merger of the Farmers' Mutual Insurance Association, Taranaki Farmers' Mutual Insurance Association and Primary Industries Insurance Company Limited in 1978. The company is incorporated under the Farmers’ Mutual Group Act 2007 and can trace its origins back to the original farmers' fire mutual organisations established in 1905.

== Sponsorship ==
FMG is currently sponsors of the following organisations:

- FMG Stadium Waikato – Hamilton's major sporting and cultural events venue
- Angus NZ – the New Zealand Angus Association.
- ESNZ – Equestrian Sports New Zealand
- New Zealand Nuffield Farming Scholarships – one of New Zealand's most prestigious farming awards.

FMG formerly held naming rights to Arena 1 in Palmerston North, Arena Manawatu's main outdoor venue. It held naming rights from 2005 until 2015.
