= Hāpuku, New Zealand =

Locality in Canterbury, New Zealand

Hāpuku
- Interactive map of Hāpuku
- Coordinates: 42.334°S 173.704°E
- Country: New Zealand
- Region: Canterbury
- Territorial authority: Kaikōura District
- Electorates: Kaikōura; Te Tai Tonga (Māori)

Government
  - Territorial Authority: Kaikōura District Council
  - Kaikōura District Mayor: Craig Mackle
  - Kaikōura MP: Stuart Smith
  - Te Tai Tonga MP: Tākuta Ferris

Area
  - Total: 15.96 km^{2} (6.16 sq mi)

Population (2023 census)
  - Total: 75
  - Density: 4.7/km^{2} (12/sq mi)

Hāpuku is a locality at the mouth of the Hāpuku River in the Canterbury Region of New Zealand. It is about 9 kilometres (5.6 mi) northeast of Kaikōura. State Highway 1 and the Main North Line run through it. Hapuku railway station opened on 13 March 1944 and closed on 29 March 1981.

== Demographics ==
Hāpuku locality, which includes Mangamaunu, covers 15.96 km^{2} (6.16 sq mi) It had a population of 75 people in the 2023 census.

Hāpuku is part of a larger area incorporating Rakautara which covers 357.23 km^{2} (137.93 sq mi) and is itself part of Kaikōura Ranges statistical area.

Historical population for the area including Hāpuku and Rakautara
| Year | Pop. | ±% p.a. |
|---|---|---|
| 2006 | 123 | — |
| 2013 | 120 | −0.35% |
| 2018 | 132 | +1.92% |
| 2023 | 162 | +4.18% |

The area had a population of 162 in the 2023 New Zealand census, an increase of 30 people (22.7%) since the 2018 census, and an increase of 42 people (35.0%) since the 2013 census. There were 84 males and 75 females in 60 dwellings. 1.9% of people identified as LGBTIQ+. The median age was 53.3 years (compared with 38.1 years nationally). There were 18 people (11.1%) aged under 15 years, 24 (14.8%) aged 15 to 29, 81 (50.0%) aged 30 to 64, and 39 (24.1%) aged 65 or older.

People could identify as more than one ethnicity. The results were 85.2% European (Pākehā); 22.2% Māori; 1.9% Pasifika; 5.6% Asian; 1.9% Middle Eastern, Latin American and African New Zealanders (MELAA); and 3.7% other, which includes people giving their ethnicity as "New Zealander". English was spoken by 96.3%, Māori by 3.7%, and other languages by 9.3%. No language could be spoken by 1.9% (e.g. too young to talk). The percentage of people born overseas was 18.5, compared with 28.8% nationally.

The sole religious affiliation given was 31.5% Christian. People who answered that they had no religion were 57.4%, and 9.3% of people did not answer the census question.

Of those at least 15 years old, 30 (20.8%) people had a bachelor's or higher degree, 75 (52.1%) had a post-high school certificate or diploma, and 39 (27.1%) people exclusively held high school qualifications. The median income was $28,700, compared with $41,500 nationally. 9 people (6.2%) earned over $100,000 compared to 12.1% nationally. The employment status of those at least 15 was 63 (43.8%) full-time, 27 (18.8%) part-time, and 3 (2.1%) unemployed.

== Education ==
Hāpuku School is a state full primary school serving students in years 1 to 8, which teaches in the Māori language. It had a roll of 15 (as of March 2026 ). It opened in 1905.
