= Melville Syme =

New Zealand community volunteer leader

Melville Syme QSM
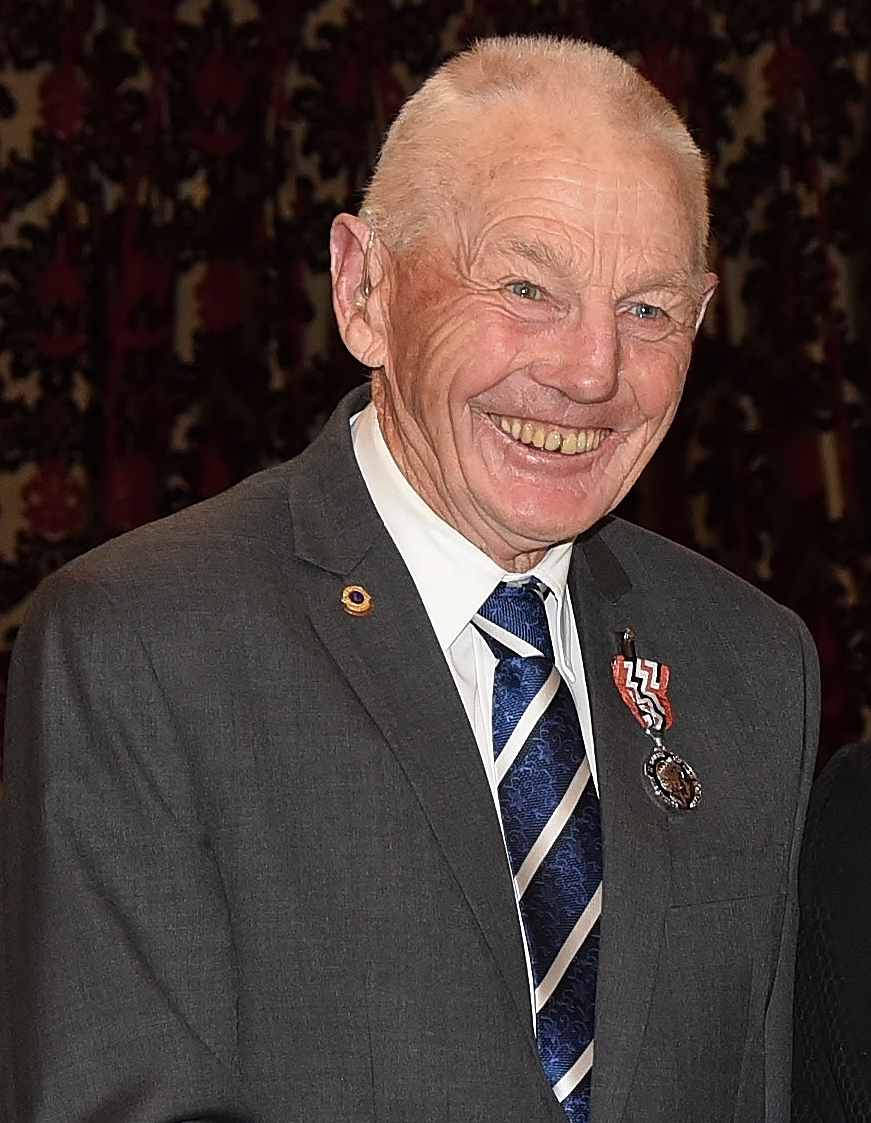
- Born: Melville Arthur Syme
- Occupation: Farmer
- Known for: Community leadership
- Spouse: Julie Syme

Melville Arthur Syme QSM is a community leader from Kaikōura, New Zealand, who has been involved in a wide range of community groups and activities in the town.

== Kaikōura Lions Club ==
Syme has been a member of the Kaikōura Lions Club since 1968 and became president after just six years. By 2023, he had been a member of the club for 55 years. He was District Governor from 2001 to 2002.

One of the significant projects led by Syme was the construction of a new footbridge over Lyell Creek, after a severe storm, ex- tropical Cyclone Alison, caused extensive damage in Kaikōura in March 1975, and damaged the existing bridge. The construction of the new footbridge required 26 working bees over a period of six months. In another community project, Syme designed and constructed a bridge on a walkway linking the Kaikōura Peninsula seal colony with Jimmy Armers beach in 2010, as part of a Lions Club initiative.

== Mayfair Theatre ==
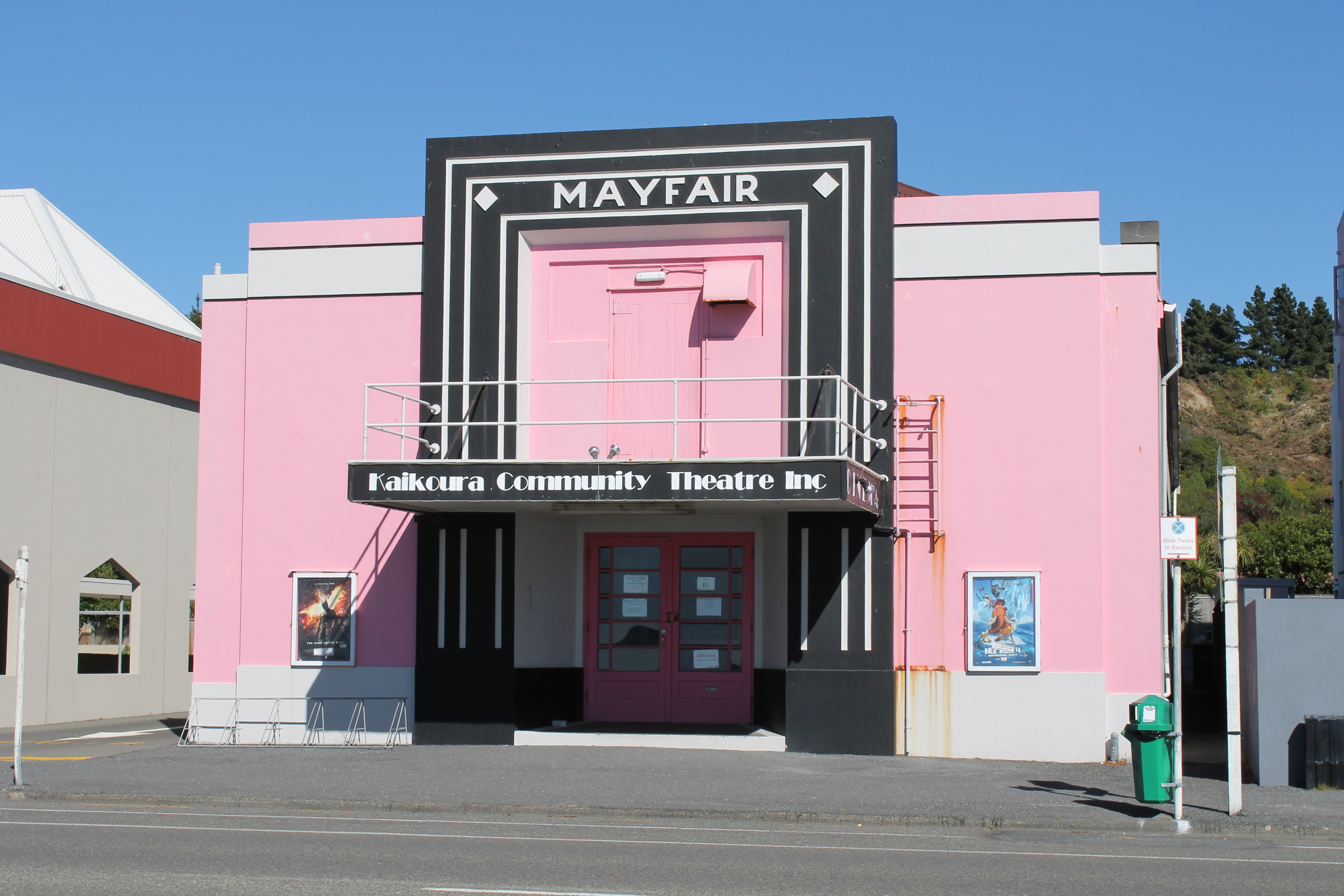
Mayfair Theatre, Kaikōura

Syme has had a long association with the Mayfair Theatre in Kaikōura, an art deco building on the Esplanade. The Mayfair Theatre was first opened in 1934 as a venue for cinema and concerts. In 1970 the theatre was leased by Kaikoura High School and purchased for $13,000 by the community. In 1984 after the school lease ended it was run by the Kaikoura Community Theatre Inc. Trust (KCT). Syme and his wife were both members of the Theatre Committee who managed the venue from that point.

Symes and his wife led a further fundraising campaign in 2013 to convert the cinema to digital technology, and this work was completed in November 2013.

The 2016 Kaikōura earthquake caused damage to the theatre building that was beyond repair. However, the 1934 art deco façade suffered only relatively minor damage, and the digital projection equipment was undamaged and was salvaged for later re-use. Syme was involved in the major fundraising efforts to build a new cinema and performance venue on the site, retaining the façade. After a $3.6 million restoration project, the building was re-opened in November 2020 as the Mayfair Arts and Culture Centre Te Whare Toi ō Kaikōura. As at 2022, Syme and his wife are members of the Mayfair Board of Directors.

== Native forest restoration ==
Another Kaikōura community project where Syme has had a significant leadership role is the restoration of an area of around 5 hectares (12 acres) of coastal native forest on land owned by the New Zealand Presbyterian Church on the hill adjacent to the racecourse in South Bay. This project was initiated by St Paul's Presbyterian Church, and was called He Timatanga Hou /New Beginnings. The project received funding support from the Community Environment Fund, the Kaikōura District Council, the Kaikōura Lions Club, Waipapa Lime Works, Kaikōura New World and Environment Canterbury. The project was also supported by Te Runanga ō Kaikōura, the Historic Places Trust and Te Runanga ō Ngāi Tahu. Syme was the representative of St Paul's Presbyterian Church on the project team. The project includes a walkway, and took five years to complete. Syme had the role of foreman for much of that time.

== Other community roles ==
Syme has been involved in many other community organisations in Kaikōura, including the Presbyterian Church, Federated Farmers, and the Kaikōura A&P Association.

== Honours and awards ==
In the 2016 Queen's Birthday Honours, Syme was awarded the Queen's Service Medal, for services to the community.

== Personal life ==
Syme and his wife Julie have been farmers. The Symes once owned all the farmland on the Kaikōura Peninsula. In 2001, they sold 170 ha (420 acres) of land on the peninsula to the tourist operation Whale Watch Kaikōura.

In 2024, Melville and Julie Syme granted a public access strip easement over their property on the peninsula to provide enduring legal access for a popular walking track from Jimmy Armers beach.
