= Medbury =

Locality in Hurunui District, Canterbury Region, New Zealand

- Locality
- Interactive map of Medbury
- Coordinates: 42°52′S 172°40′E
- Country: New Zealand
- Region: Canterbury
- Territorial authority: Hurunui District
- Ward: West Ward
- Electorates: Kaikōura; Te Tai Tonga

Government
  - Territorial Authority: Hurunui District Council
  - Regional council: Environment Canterbury
  - Mayor of Hurunui: Marie Black
  - Kaikoura MP: Stuart Smith
  - Te Tai Tonga MP: Tākuta Ferris

Area
  - Total: 42.49 km^{2} (16.41 sq mi)

Population (2023 census)
  - Total: 114
  - Density: 2.68/km^{2} (6.95/sq mi)
- Time zone: UTC+12 (New Zealand Standard Time)
  - Summer (DST): UTC+13 (New Zealand Daylight Time)
- Postcode: 7385

Medbury is a rural locality in the Canterbury region of New Zealand's South Island, situated near the Hurunui River and State Highway 7. There is no longer a significant population base forming a township, just rural properties.

On 15 December 1884, the railway line was extended to Medbury Waikari was opened to Medbury, which remained the terminus for just over a year until the line was further extended to Culverden on 8 February 1886. Initially, the line was intended to become the Main North Line to Nelson and Blenheim, but a coastal route via Parnassus and Kaikōura was chosen. The line through Medbury had its furthest terminus in Waiau and it became known as the Waiau Branch. Medbury station had a loading bank, stockyards, and a water tank for steam locomotives, and a goods shed was installed in 1924. The station was closed due to low traffic in 1974, with the line's closure taking place on 15 January 1978. The goods shed still stands, relocated to a farmer's paddock.

== Demographics ==
Medbury locality covers 42.59 km^{2} (16.44 sq mi). It is part of the larger Upper Hurunui statistical area.

Historical population
Year	Pop.	±% p.a.
2006	90	—
2013	117	+3.82%
2018	123	+1.01%
2023	114	−1.51%

Medbury had a population of 114 in the 2023 New Zealand census, a decrease of 9 people (−7.3%) since the 2018 census, and a decrease of 3 people (−2.6%) since the 2013 census. There were 57 males and 60 females in 36 dwellings. The median age was 36.9 years (compared with 38.1 years nationally). There were 33 people (28.9%) aged under 15 years, 15 (13.2%) aged 15 to 29, 63 (55.3%) aged 30 to 64, and 6 (5.3%) aged 65 or older.

People could identify as more than one ethnicity. The results were 81.6% European (Pākehā); 2.6% Māori; 18.4% Asian; and 2.6% Middle Eastern, Latin American and African New Zealanders (MELAA). English was spoken by 100.0%, Māori by 2.6%, and other languages by 10.5%. The percentage of people born overseas was 23.7, compared with 28.8% nationally.

Religious affiliations were 36.8% Christian, and 2.6% New Age. People who answered that they had no religion were 57.9%, and 5.3% of people did not answer the census question.

Of those at least 15 years old, 24 (29.6%) people had a bachelor's or higher degree, 48 (59.3%) had a post-high school certificate or diploma, and 24 (29.6%) people exclusively held high school qualifications. The median income was $45,300, compared with $41,500 nationally. 15 people (18.5%) earned over $100,000 compared to 12.1% nationally. The employment status of those at least 15 was 48 (59.3%) full-time and 18 (22.2%) part-time.

== Climate ==
Climate data for Medbury (1991–2020 normals, extremes 1927–1991, 2016–present)
Month	Jan	Feb	Mar	Apr	May	Jun	Jul	Aug	Sep	Oct	Nov	Dec	Year
Record high °C (°F)	37.9 (100.2)	36.0 (96.8)	32.8 (91.0)	29.4 (84.9)	25.7 (78.3)	23.9 (75.0)	20.6 (69.1)	22.8 (73.0)	27.5 (81.5)	29.1 (84.4)	31.1 (88.0)	33.1 (91.6)	37.9 (100.2)
Mean daily maximum °C (°F)	23.4 (74.1)	23.4 (74.1)	20.9 (69.6)	17.6 (63.7)	14.8 (58.6)	11.6 (52.9)	11.4 (52.5)	12.9 (55.2)	14.8 (58.6)	17.1 (62.8)	18.9 (66.0)	21.2 (70.2)	17.3 (63.2)
Daily mean °C (°F)	17.1 (62.8)	16.9 (62.4)	14.5 (58.1)	11.4 (52.5)	9.0 (48.2)	6.0 (42.8)	5.8 (42.4)	7.2 (45.0)	9.3 (48.7)	11.2 (52.2)	13.2 (55.8)	15.3 (59.5)	11.4 (52.5)
Mean daily minimum °C (°F)	10.9 (51.6)	10.3 (50.5)	8.1 (46.6)	5.1 (41.2)	3.3 (37.9)	0.4 (32.7)	0.2 (32.4)	1.4 (34.5)	3.8 (38.8)	5.3 (41.5)	7.4 (45.3)	9.4 (48.9)	5.5 (41.8)
Record low °C (°F)	−1.1 (30.0)	−0.6 (30.9)	−2.0 (28.4)	−5.6 (21.9)	−8.3 (17.1)	−10.0 (14.0)	−13.3 (8.1)	−9.2 (15.4)	−6.7 (19.9)	−5.3 (22.5)	−3.3 (26.1)	−1.2 (29.8)	−13.3 (8.1)
Average rainfall mm (inches)	40.0 (1.57)	37.5 (1.48)	57.1 (2.25)	53.1 (2.09)	59.3 (2.33)	50.7 (2.00)	57.1 (2.25)	73.1 (2.88)	49.8 (1.96)	57.9 (2.28)	41.2 (1.62)	42.0 (1.65)	618.8 (24.36)
Source: NIWA (rainfall 1971–2000)

1.Extremes includes nearby Balmoral Forest station.
