= Ashley Forest =

Forest and locality in Canterbury, New Zealand

- Locality
- Interactive map of Ashley Forest
- Coordinates: 43.128°S 172.496°E
- Country: New Zealand
- Region: Canterbury
- Territorial authority: Hurunui District
- Ward: South Ward
- Electorates: Kaikōura; Te Tai Tonga

Government
  - Territorial Authority: Hurunui District Council
  - Regional council: Environment Canterbury
  - Mayor of Hurunui: Marie Black
  - Kaikoura MP: Stuart Smith
  - Te Tai Tonga MP: Tākuta Ferris

Area
  - Total: 340.57 km^{2} (131.49 sq mi)

Population (June 2025)
  - Total: 850
  - Density: 2.5/km^{2} (6.5/sq mi)
- Time zone: UTC+12 (New Zealand Standard Time)
  - Summer (DST): UTC+13 (New Zealand Daylight Time)

Ashley Forest is a forest and a statistical area in the Canterbury Region's Hurunui District on the east coast of New Zealand's South Island. It is located north of the Ashley River / Rakahuri and northeast of the Okuku River.

The forest was planted from 1939. It is managed by Rayonier Matariki and is only accessible by the public with a permit.

Ashley Forest Village is a small settlement at the southern end of the forest.

== Demographics ==
The Ashley Forest statistical area covers 340.57 km^{2} (131.49 sq mi). It had an estimated population of 850 as of June 2025, with a population density of 2.5 people per km^{2}.

Historical population
Year	Pop.	±% p.a.
2006	522	—
2013	642	+3.00%
2018	669	+0.83%
2023	807	+3.82%

Ashley Forest had a population of 807 in the 2023 New Zealand census, an increase of 138 people (20.6%) since the 2018 census, and an increase of 165 people (25.7%) since the 2013 census. There were 414 males, 393 females, and 3 people of other genders in 279 dwellings. 3.0% of people identified as LGBTIQ+. The median age was 41.9 years (compared with 38.1 years nationally). There were 186 people (23.0%) aged under 15 years, 99 (12.3%) aged 15 to 29, 405 (50.2%) aged 30 to 64, and 123 (15.2%) aged 65 or older.

People could identify as more than one ethnicity. The results were 94.8% European (Pākehā); 11.9% Māori; 0.7% Pasifika; 1.9% Asian; 0.4% Middle Eastern, Latin American and African New Zealanders (MELAA); and 5.9% other, which includes people giving their ethnicity as "New Zealander". English was spoken by 97.0%, Māori by 1.9%, and other languages by 5.2%. No language could be spoken by 2.6% (e.g. too young to talk). The percentage of people born overseas was 14.9, compared with 28.8% nationally.

Religious affiliations were 29.7% Christian, and 0.7% other religions. People who answered that they had no religion were 61.3%, and 7.4% of people did not answer the census question.

Of those at least 15 years old, 150 (24.2%) people had a bachelor's or higher degree, 369 (59.4%) had a post-high school certificate or diploma, and 108 (17.4%) people exclusively held high school qualifications. The median income was $39,600, compared with $41,500 nationally. 81 people (13.0%) earned over $100,000 compared to 12.1% nationally. The employment status of those at least 15 was 315 (50.7%) full-time, 138 (22.2%) part-time, and 12 (1.9%) unemployed.

== Climate ==
Climate data for Ashley Forest (1991–2020 normals, extremes 1942–1989)
Month	Jan	Feb	Mar	Apr	May	Jun	Jul	Aug	Sep	Oct	Nov	Dec	Year
Record high °C (°F)	34.4 (93.9)	39.8 (103.6)	33.9 (93.0)	28.3 (82.9)	26.7 (80.1)	22.4 (72.3)	20.9 (69.6)	22.2 (72.0)	29.4 (84.9)	30.0 (86.0)	30.5 (86.9)	31.7 (89.1)	39.8 (103.6)
Mean daily maximum °C (°F)	21.6 (70.9)	21.3 (70.3)	19.9 (67.8)	17.3 (63.1)	14.0 (57.2)	11.7 (53.1)	10.9 (51.6)	12.0 (53.6)	14.5 (58.1)	16.3 (61.3)	17.9 (64.2)	20.1 (68.2)	16.5 (61.6)
Daily mean °C (°F)	16.5 (61.7)	16.3 (61.3)	14.7 (58.5)	12.4 (54.3)	9.7 (49.5)	7.5 (45.5)	6.6 (43.9)	7.6 (45.7)	9.6 (49.3)	11.4 (52.5)	12.9 (55.2)	15.1 (59.2)	11.7 (53.1)
Mean daily minimum °C (°F)	11.5 (52.7)	11.4 (52.5)	9.6 (49.3)	7.4 (45.3)	5.4 (41.7)	3.3 (37.9)	2.4 (36.3)	3.3 (37.9)	4.7 (40.5)	6.6 (43.9)	8.0 (46.4)	10.2 (50.4)	7.0 (44.6)
Record low °C (°F)	1.7 (35.1)	3.0 (37.4)	0.6 (33.1)	0.0 (32.0)	−2.2 (28.0)	−5.6 (21.9)	−6.4 (20.5)	−3.4 (25.9)	−4.0 (24.8)	−1.1 (30.0)	−2.0 (28.4)	1.5 (34.7)	−6.4 (20.5)
Average rainfall mm (inches)	57.3 (2.26)	57.6 (2.27)	84.3 (3.32)	70.4 (2.77)	59.1 (2.33)	62.7 (2.47)	78.2 (3.08)	69.9 (2.75)	64.8 (2.55)	84.1 (3.31)	50.7 (2.00)	65.3 (2.57)	804.4 (31.68)
Source: NIWA
