= Kaikōura District =

District in Canterbury, New Zealand

- Territorial authority district
- Interactive map of Kaikōura District
- Coordinates: 42°24′09″S 173°40′57″E
- Country: New Zealand
- Region: Canterbury

Government
  - Mayor: Craig Mackle
  - Territorial authority: Kaikōura District Council

Area
  - Total: 2,046.85 km^{2} (790.29 sq mi)

Population (June 2025)
  - Total: 4,340
  - Density: 2.12/km^{2} (5.49/sq mi)
- Website: www.kaikoura.govt.nz

The Kaikōura District (/kaɪˈkɔːrə/; Māori pronunciation: [kaiˈkoːuɾa]) is a territorial authority district in the Canterbury Region of the South Island of New Zealand. The district encompasses the eponymous town of Kaikōura, a number of small towns and settlements and the surrounding rural area in northern Canterbury. The district had an estimated population of 4,340 as of June 2025.

== Geography ==
The Kaikōura District extends from the Pacific Ocean to the highest points of the Kaikōura Ranges to the west, and along the coastline from Oaro in the south, to just beyond Kekerengu in the north. The total land area of the Kaikōura District is 2,048 km^{2} (791 sq mi). The Ka Whata Tu O Rakihouia Conservation Park covering part of the Seaward Kaikōura Range between Kaikōura and Clarence has an area of 88,065 ha (217,610 acres) representing 43% of the total land area of the District.

=== Populated places ===
Populated places within the district, aside from Kaikōura township, include:

- Main settlements:
  - Kekerengu
  - Clarence
  - Rakautara
  - Hapuku
  - Ocean Ridge
  - The Elms
  - Peketa
  - Goose Bay
  - Oaro
- Minor localities:
  - Ngaio Downs
  - Parikawa
  - Mangamaunu
  - South Bay
  - Mount Fyffe
  - Swyncombe
  - Mount Furneaux
  - Lynton Downs
- Other communities:
  - Waipapa Bay
  - Okini Bay
  - Half Moon Bay
  - Puhi Puhi
  - Inland Road

== Governance ==
The Kaikōura District Council (Māori: Ko te kaunihera ā rohe o Kaikōura) administers the district. The council consists of a mayor and seven councillors. Elections for positions on the council are held every three years in conjunction with nationwide local elections.

=== History ===
During the era of provincial government from 1853, the Kaikōura region was initially part of the Nelson Province, and was represented at the Nelson Provincial Council through the Amuri electorate. When the Marlborough Province split off from the Nelson Province, Kaikōura became part of that new province, with the Conway River as the new southern boundary. From 1860, the Kaikōura region was represented on the Marlborough Provincial Council first through the Flaxbourne and Clarence electorate, then the Clarence electorate, and finally the Awatere electorate. Provincial government was abolished at the end of 1876, and counties were formed instead.

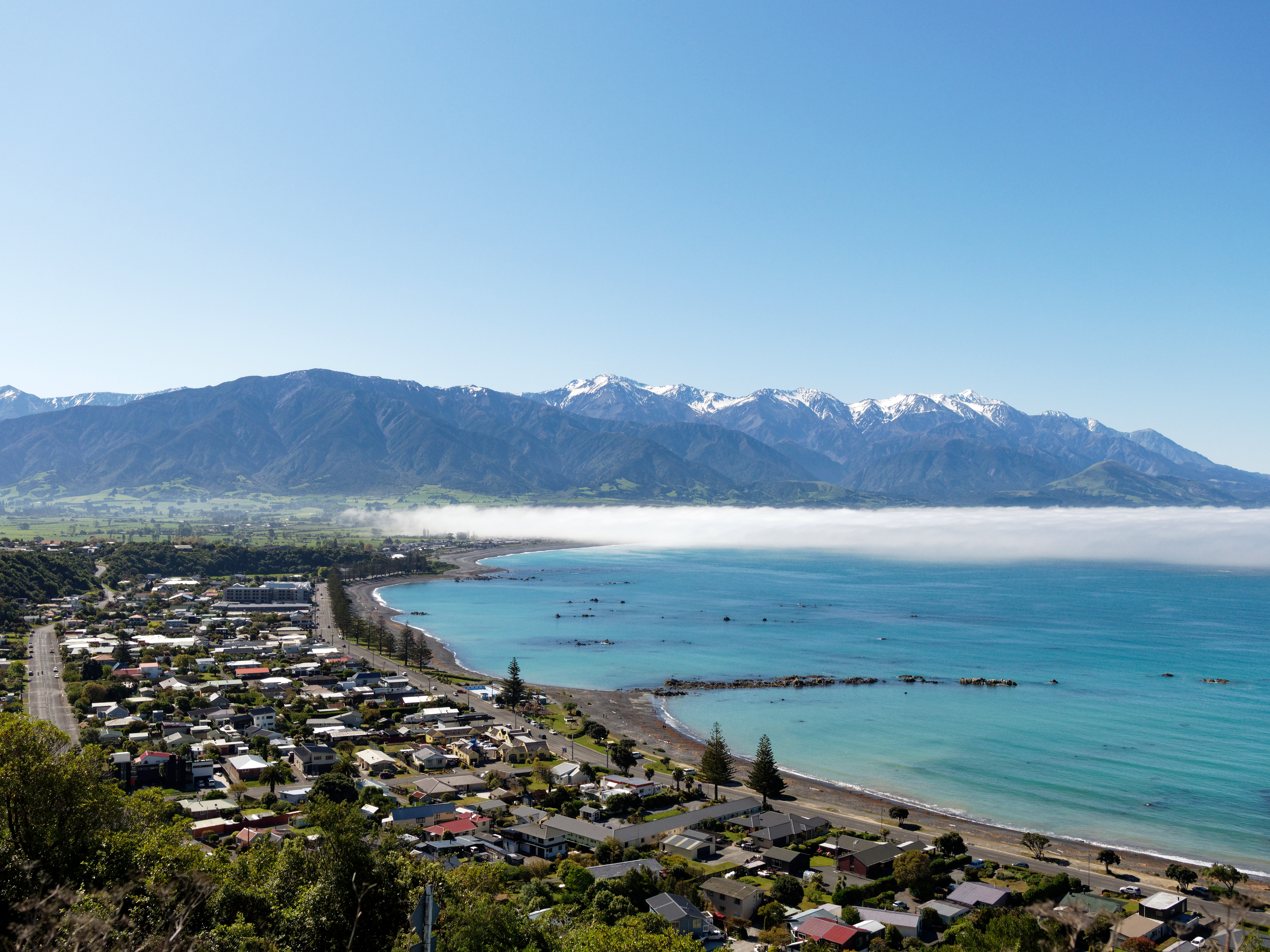
Kaikōura as seen from Kaikōura Peninsula, with sea fog

From 1877, Kaikōura was governed by Kaikoura County. The county's boundary was adjusted northwards in 1940 to take over most of the East Coast Riding of Awatere County. There were also desires for land from Cheviot County to transfer to Kaikoura County, but the petition lapsed. In 1952, there were moves for a borough to be formed for Kaikōura township, but the underlying concerns which led to this initiative were addressed in different ways and no borough was formed. A 1971 scheme to form a Hurunui County would have seen Kaikoura County lose the area south of the Hundalee Hills, but this did not proceed.

The 1989 local government reforms disestablished all counties, and district and regional councils were formed instead. Kaikōura District was formed in the process, with the land south of the Hundalee Hills transferred to Hurunui District as per the 1971 proposal. At a regional level, Kaikōura belonged to the Nelson-Marlborough Regional Council. When the regional council was disestablished in 1992 after only three years, and its functions went to the unitary authorities of Nelson City Council, Tasman District Council, and Marlborough District Council, Kaikōura transferred to the Canterbury Regional Council. In 1993, an elector-initiated appeal wanted the northern 59% of Kaikōura District to be transferred to Marlborough District, but this was rejected by the Local Government Commission. There was a further elector-initiated proposal for Kaikoura District to merge with Hurunui District, but the Local Government Commission rejected this in 2009.

=== Anniversary day observance ===
In terms of its provincial anniversary holiday, Kaikōura observes the anniversary of Marlborough Province due to its historic association. This meant that the public holiday observed by the Canterbury Earthquake Commemoration Day Act 2011 did not apply in Kaikōura District, as it only applied to the area where the Canterbury Anniversary Day is observed.

== Demographics ==
Kaikōura District covers 2,046.85 km^{2} (790.29 sq mi) and had an estimated population of 4,340 as of June 2025, with a population density of 2.1 people per km^{2}.

Historical population
| Year | Pop. | ±% p.a. |
|---|---|---|
| 2006 | 3,621 | — |
| 2013 | 3,552 | −0.27% |
| 2018 | 3,912 | +1.95% |
| 2023 | 4,215 | +1.50% |

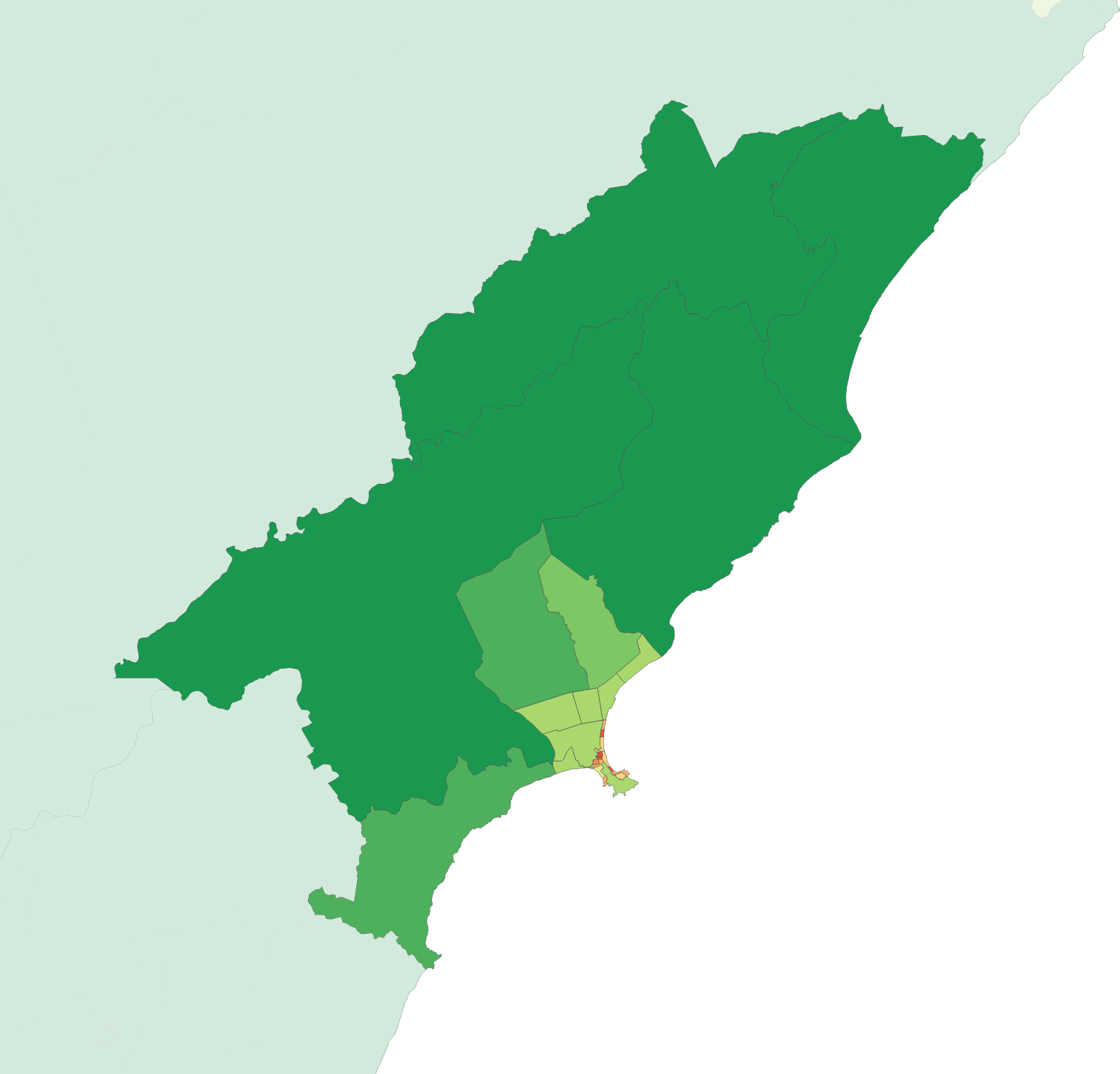
Population density in the 2023 census

Kaikōura District had a population of 4,215 in the 2023 New Zealand census, an increase of 303 people (7.7%) since the 2018 census, and an increase of 663 people (18.7%) since the 2013 census. There were 2,100 males, 2,112 females and 6 people of other genders in 1,779 dwellings. 1.6% of people identified as LGBTIQ+. The median age was 50.3 years (compared with 38.1 years nationally). There were 645 people (15.3%) aged under 15 years, 531 (12.6%) aged 15 to 29, 1,911 (45.3%) aged 30 to 64, and 1,128 (26.8%) aged 65 or older.

People could identify as more than one ethnicity. The results were 87.0% European (Pākehā); 19.0% Māori; 1.0% Pasifika; 3.9% Asian; 0.7% Middle Eastern, Latin American and African New Zealanders (MELAA); and 3.7% other, which includes people giving their ethnicity as "New Zealander". English was spoken by 98.4%, Māori language by 3.6%, Samoan by 0.1% and other languages by 6.7%. No language could be spoken by 1.2% (e.g. too young to talk). New Zealand Sign Language was known by 0.5%. The percentage of people born overseas was 15.6, compared with 28.8% nationally.

Religious affiliations were 32.2% Christian, 0.4% Hindu, 0.5% Islam, 0.6% Māori religious beliefs, 0.4% Buddhist, 0.6% New Age, and 1.5% other religions. People who answered that they had no religion were 56.7%, and 7.7% of people did not answer the census question.

Of those at least 15 years old, 417 (11.7%) people had a bachelor's or higher degree, 1,992 (55.8%) had a post-high school certificate or diploma, and 1,038 (29.1%) people exclusively held high school qualifications. The median income was $33,300, compared with $41,500 nationally. 213 people (6.0%) earned over $100,000 compared to 12.1% nationally. The employment status of those at least 15 was that 1,605 (45.0%) people were employed full-time, 621 (17.4%) were part-time, and 42 (1.2%) were unemployed.

== Economy ==
In 2025, the Kaikōura District Council was classified as the smallest territorial authority in New Zealand, based on a multi-criteria analysis.

Historically the economy of the district was based on primary industries including pastoral farming, dairy and fishing. Since the 1980s, the district has become a major tourism destination, with ecotourism attractions including whale watching, swimming with seals and dolphins, and albatross encounters, along with recreational opportunities including coastal walks, cycle trails, golf and surfing. There was a significant downturn in visitors caused by the 2016 earthquake, with the COVID-19 pandemic creating further impact in 2020–21. A $35 million 4.5-star hotel was due to open in September 2021, but work was delayed due to the loss of international tourists because of the COVID-19 pandemic. It was expected to provide economic stimulus to Kaikōura. The 120-room hotel opened in October 2022. By 2024, tourism and economic activity in the town had rebounded. As of 2024, the district receives around one million visitors each year,and tourism contributes almost 40% of the district GDP. The results of the 2018 Census showed that around a third of all properties in the district were unoccupied, suggesting that they are either holiday homes or held for short-term rentals as visitor accommodation.

In 2023-24, the GDP of the Kaikōura District was $190 million, with annual growth for the region of 3.3%. Tourism provided 27.6% of jobs in Kaikōura District in 2023, with accommodation and food services representing another 18.5%.

In addition to ecotourism activities in the town, such as whale, seal, and bird watching, further tourism opportunities are under development. These include astrotourism, following accreditation of the Kaikōura District as an International Dark Sky Sanctuary, and the construction of a long-distance cycle trail from Picton to Kaikōura known as the Whale Trail.

== See also ==
- List of historic places in Kaikōura District
- Biodiversity of the Kaikōura region
