= Whale Trail (New Zealand) =

Long-distance trail in the South Island

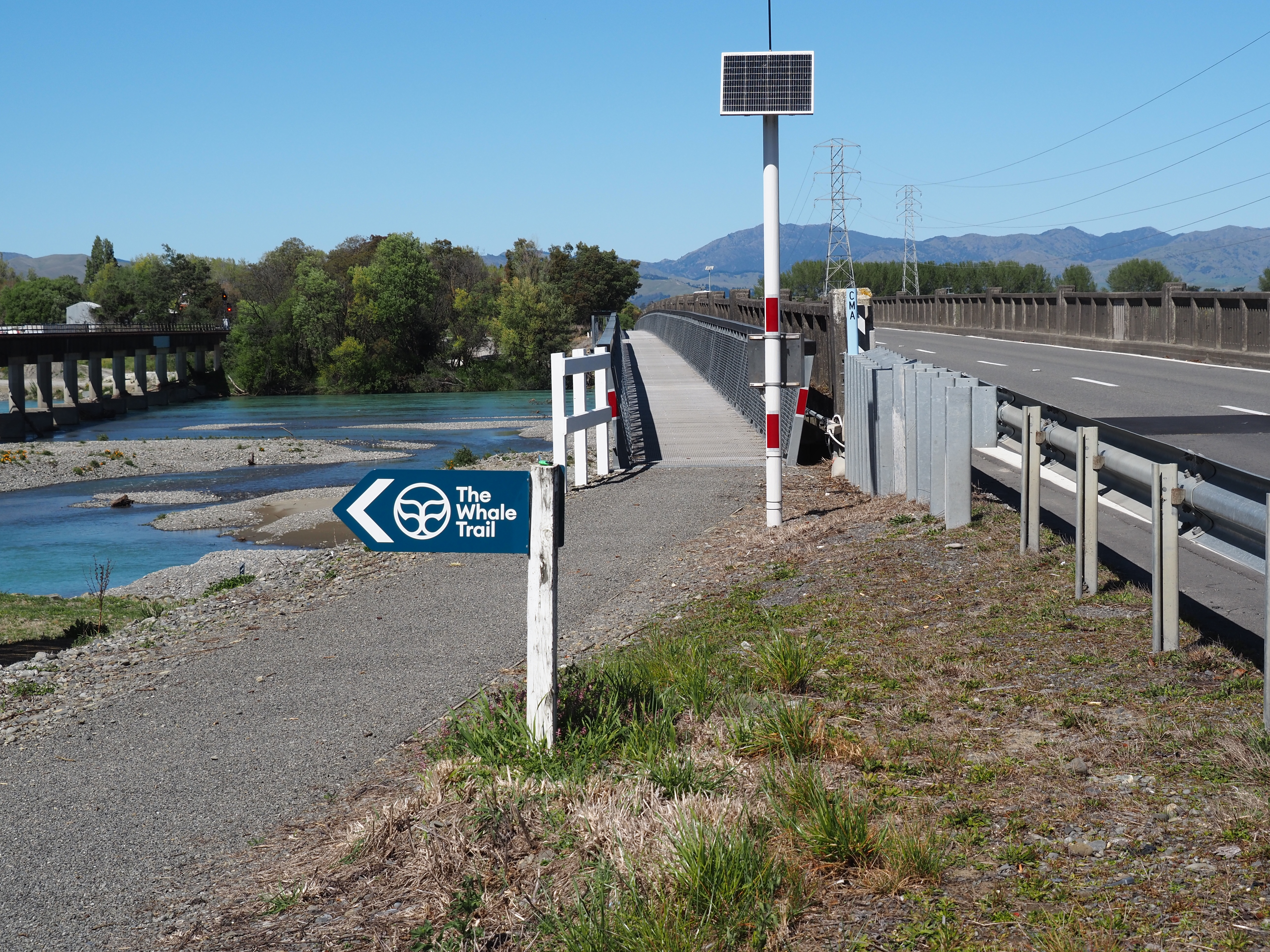
- Wairau River Bridge – clip-on for walking and cycling
- Length: 200 km (120 mi)
- Location: Kaikōura, Marlborough districts, New Zealand
- Trailheads: Picton, Kaikōura
- Use: Walking; Cycling; Horse riding
- Season: Year round
- Sights: coastal scenery, rural scenery, railway viaducts
- Website: thewhaletrail.nz

Trail map
- Interactive map of the Whale Trail

The Whale Trail is a shared-use long-distance trail under construction from Picton to Kaikōura in the South Island of New Zealand. When completed, the trail will provide a route between Picton, Blenheim, Seddon, Ward, Kekerengu, Clarence and Kaikōura. Construction of the trail has included modifications to bridges, and environmental enhancement of places along the route with native plantings. The trail is expected to become one of the New Zealand Cycle Trail Great Rides on completion.

As of January 2026, the trail is open between Tuamarina and Ward, and the section between the Hāpuku River and Kaikōura is also open.

== History ==
The Marlborough Kaikōura Trail Trust was formed in 2017 to develop plans for a trail between Picton and Kaikōura. In 2019, the project received $322,000 from the New Zealand Government's Provincial Growth Fund for investigation of route options. A further $18m of funding was provided in 2020 by the Government's Regional Economic Development and Investment Unit. It was forecast that on completion, 43,000 people would use the trail each year, with around 7,000 international tourists.

In 2021, there was public controversy about the choice of route through the small settlement of Tuamarina, between Picton and Blenheim. Local residents were concerned about safety, and possible unruly behaviour by cyclists. In 2022, a clip-on structure was added to the State Highway 1 bridge over the Wairau River, to provide a safer crossing for cyclists and walkers on the section between Picton and Blenheim. A 33-kilometre-long (21 mi) section of the trail between Blenheim and Seddon was opened in 2023. This section of trail passes across the historic Awatere road/rail bridge, originally opened in 1902 and decommissioned for road traffic in 2008. The former single-lane vehicle deck below the rail deck was restored and re-opened for cyclists and walkers in December 2023.

In 2024, work began on the construction of a 13 km (8.1 mi) section from Kaikōura northwards to Hāpuku, based on upgrades to existing cycle routes including part of the Kaikōura Trail. By June, upgrades were completed to 3.3 km (2.1 mi) of existing trail from the centre of Kaikōura north to Middle Creek, and the Kaikōura District Council had committed funding to complete the upgrade of the 13 km (8.1 mi) section to Hāpuku. Community groups and businesses in Kaikōura provided funds for three cycle bridges to be built on a 2 km (1.2 mi) section of the trail, north of Kaikōura, enabling the full 13 km (8.1 mi) route from Kaikōura to Hāpuku to be completely separated from roadways. Work on the Kaikōura to Hāpuku section was expected to be complete by end 2026.

As at June 2024, 74 km (46 mi) of the full length of trail from Picton to Kaikōura had been completed. At the northern end of the trail, in August 2024, organisers expressed frustration that funding was not available for the New Zealand Transport Agency to complete a 1.7 km (1.1 mi) section from Picton up to The Elevation.

The 39 km (24 mi) Flaxbourne section of the trail between Seddon and Ward was completed in April 2025.

As of September 2026 around 157 km (98 mi) of trail had been constructed, representing 94% of the 167 km (104 mi) of trail build that had been contracted with the Ministry for Business, Innovation and Employment. The Clarence to Hāpuku section was unfunded, but negotiations about route options were proceeding with Te Rūnanga o Kaikōura and the Crown.

== Route ==
When completed, the trail will provide a route between Picton, Blenheim, Seddon, Ward, Kekerengu, Clarence and Kaikōura. Most of the length of the trail lies close to the route of State Highway 1, the main road between the two trailheads, with a major deviation between the townships of Seddon and Ward. Between these two settlements the trail runs coastwards before turning south to skirt Lake Grassmere, from there following the South Island Main Trunk railway line into Ward.

Trail sections
Section name	End points	Distance (km)	Status
Waitohi	Picton Elevation – Tuamarina	20.5	Partially open
Wairau	Tuamarina – Blenheim	14.6	Open
Awatere	Blenheim – Seddon	32.4	Open
Flaxbourne	Seddon – Ward	39.3	Open
Kekerengu	Ward – Kekerengu	29.4	Under construction
Waiau toa	Kekerengu – Clarence	29.4	In planning
Puhi Puhi	Clarence – Hāpuku		Future development
Kaikoura	Hāpuku – Kaikōura	13.1	Open

The trail is expected to become one of the New Zealand Cycle Trail Great Rides on completion.
