= Julie Syme =

New Zealand community leader

Julie Syme QSM
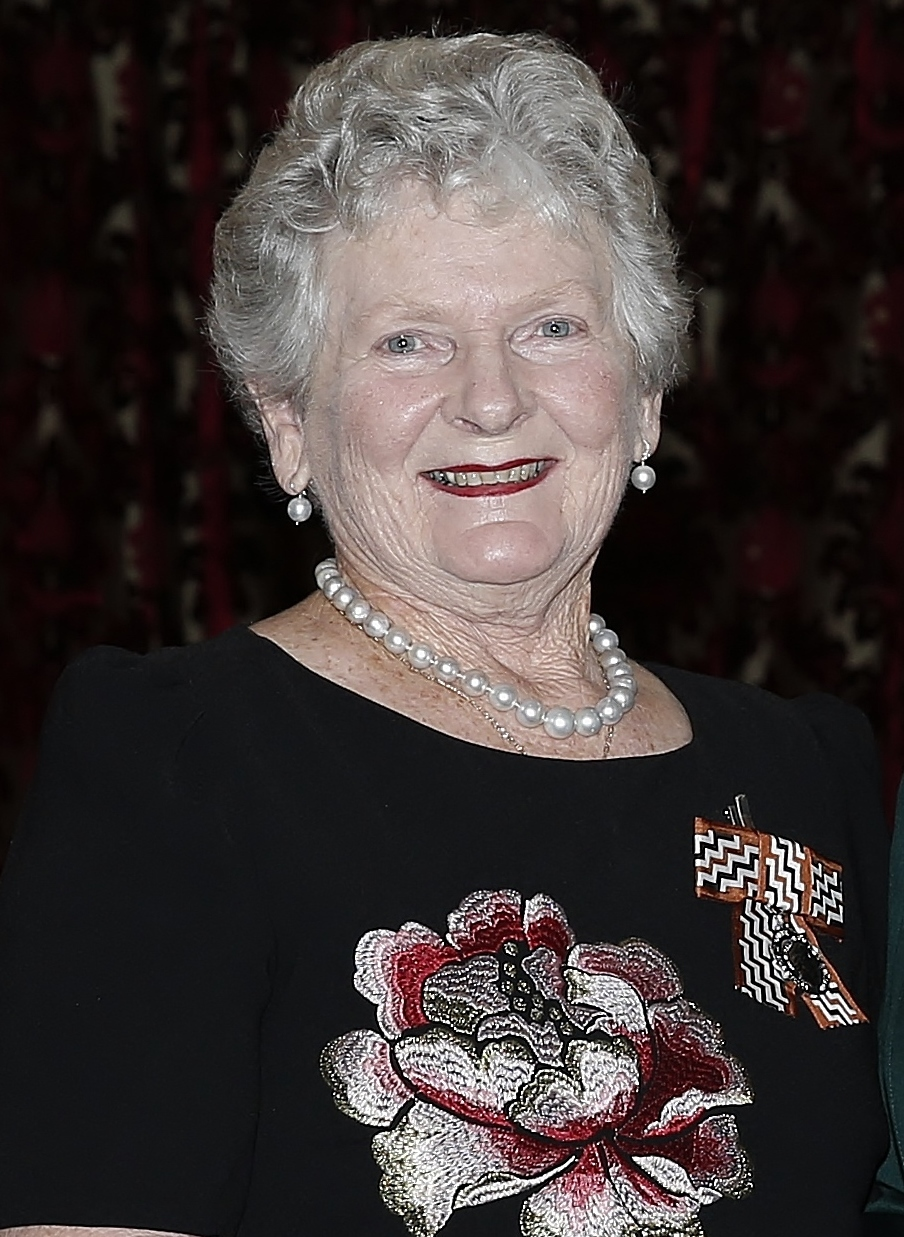
- Born: Julie Patricia Syme
- Education: University of Otago
- Occupation: Community leader
- Spouse: Melville Syme

Julie Patricia Syme QSM is a community leader from Kaikōura, New Zealand, who has been involved in a wide range of community groups and activities in the town.

== Lions Club of Seaward Kaikōura ==
Syme was a founding member of the Lions Club of Seaward Kaikōura, incorporated in 1992. She worked to establish the Seaward Kaikōura Lions as a club for women because at that time the majority of community service clubs were run by men. Symes was the charter President, and has been District Governor. She stood down in 2017 after serving three terms as President.

One of the fundraising initiatives led by Syme was the Trash Fashion Show, involving designers presenting garments made from recycled materials. The first show was held in 1999. The show has raised over $100,000 for community groups.

In 2015, the Lions Club of Seaward Kaikōura and the Kaikōura Lions Clubs announced that they had raised $243,000 towards the construction of facilities at a new integrated health facility to be built in the town.

Following the 7.8 magnitude Kaikōura earthquake on 14 November 2016, Syme, in her role as president, worked with Lions Club members to distribute food and water around the town and provide emergency grants for essential supplies. In 2017, Syme spoke to 20,000 delegates at the 100th Annual Lions Club International Convention in Chicago about her experience serving the Kaikōura community after the earthquake.

== Mayfair Theatre ==
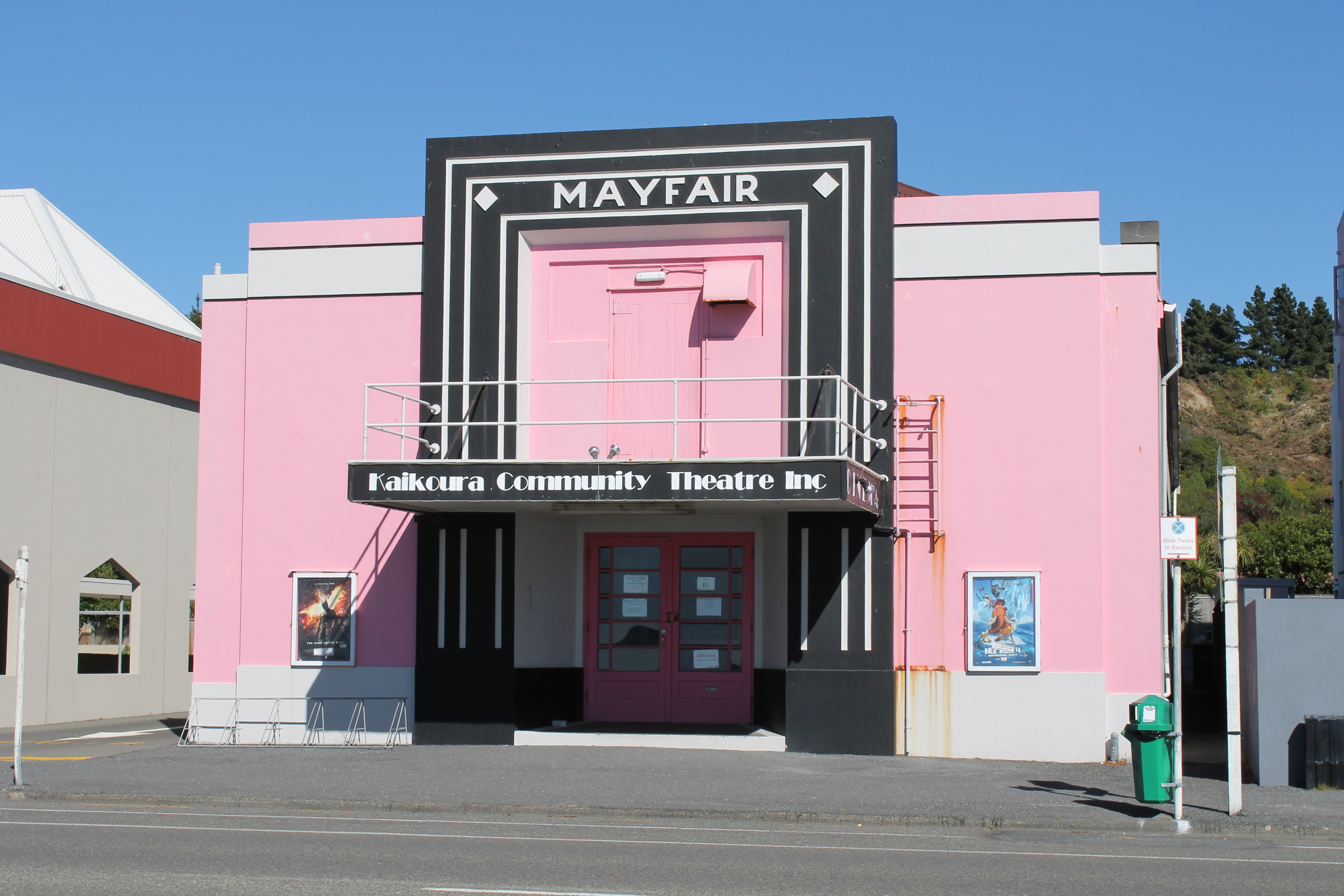
Mayfair Theatre, Kaikōura

Syme has had a long association with the Mayfair Theatre in Kaikōura, an art deco building on The Esplanade. The Mayfair Theatre was first opened in 1934 as a venue for cinema and concerts. In 1970 the theatre was leased by Kaikoura High School and purchased for $13,000 by the community. In 1984 after the school lease ended it was run by the Kaikoura Community Theatre Inc. Trust (KCT). Syme and her husband were both members of the Theatre Committee which managed the venue from that point.

The building was damaged beyond repair in the 2016 Kaikōura earthquake, and Syme was involved in the major fundraising efforts to build a new cinema and performance venue on the site, retaining the 1934 art deco façade. After a $3.6 million restoration project, the building was re-opened in November 2020 as the Mayfair Arts and Culture Centre Te Whare Toi ō Kaikōura. As at 2022, Syme and her husband Melville are members of the Mayfair Board of Directors.

== Other community roles ==
Syme has been a trustee of the Kaikōura Education Trust, the secretary for the Kaikōura Royal New Zealand Returned and Services' Association from 2008 to 2016, and foundation secretary of the Kaikōura Community Theatre. She has also supported the local branch of the Plunket Society, Playcentre, Red Cross, and the Presbyterian Church. Syme has also been the secretary of the Community Hall Committee and president of the Kaikōura Garden Club.

== Honours and awards ==
In the 2018 New Year Honours, Syme was awarded the Queen's Service Medal for services to the community. Syme said about the award, "You don’t do things for reward. You just do things because you get pleasure from making a difference in your community".

== Personal life ==
Syme studied at the Dunedin College of Education in 1962. She and her husband Melville have been farmers. In 2024, Melville and Julie Syme granted a public access strip easement over their property on the peninsula to provide enduring legal access for a popular walking track from Jimmy Armers beach.
