= List of historic places in Kaikōura District =

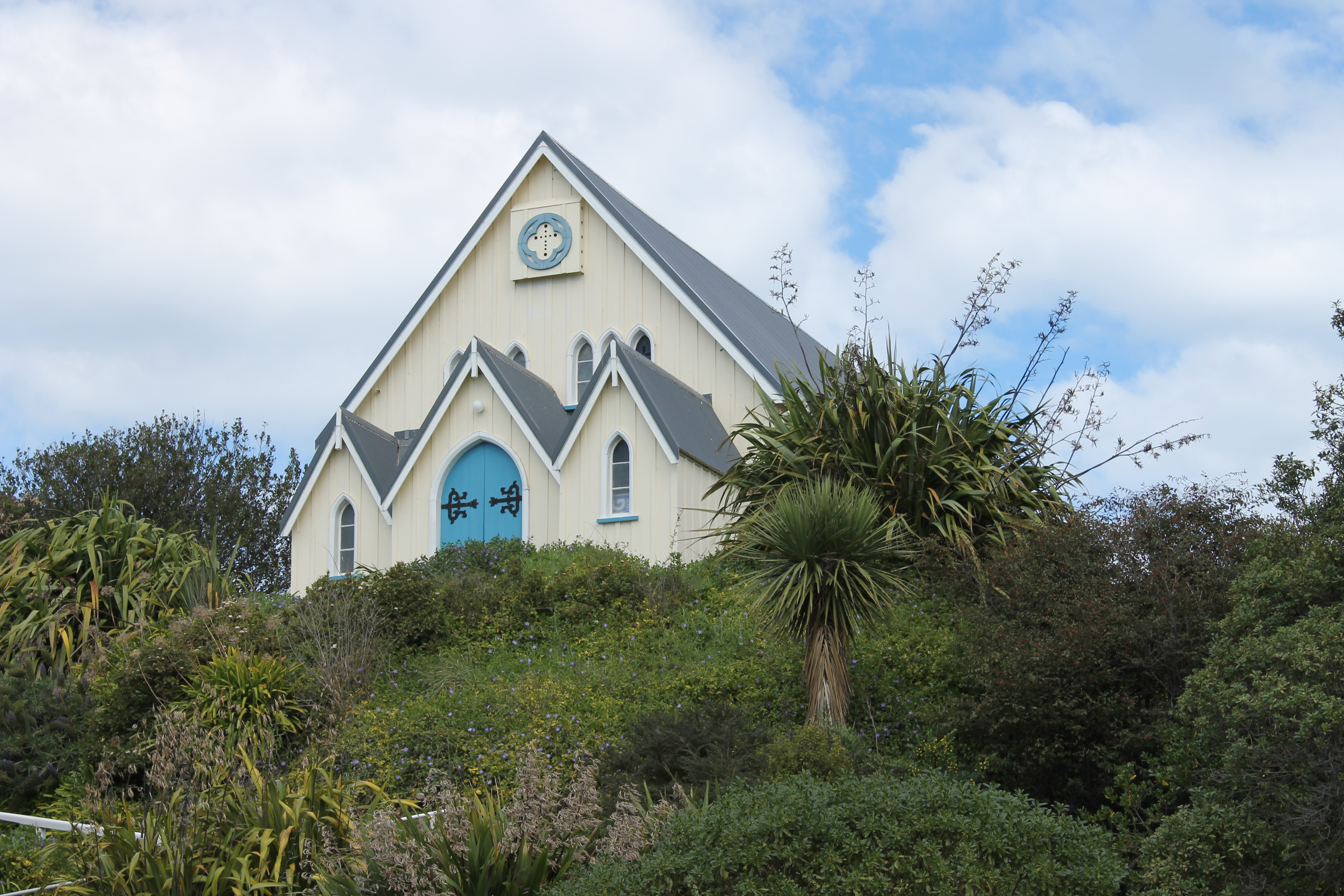
St. Paul's Presbyterian Church, a Category 2 Historic Place in Kaikōura.

The Kaikōura District is a territorial authority of New Zealand located on the eastern coast of the South Island in northern Canterbury. The region was historically an important Māori settlement area from the earliest period of inhabitation. European inhabitation began in the 1840s with the establishment of whaling stations. Following the decline of the industry, the region shifted towards fishing. The eponymous district centre of Kaikōura was historically a small and isolated fishing village. Road connections were limited to bridle paths prior to 1900, and no rail access was available until the opening of the Main North Line in 1945. Tourism has become an important industry in the area today, alongside agriculture and cheesemaking.

Heritage New Zealand classification of sites on the New Zealand Heritage List / Rārangi Kōrero, in accordance with the Heritage New Zealand Pouhere Taonga Act 2014, distinguishes between Category 1 ("places of special or outstanding historical or cultural significance") and Category 2 ("places of historic or cultural significance"). Sites containing a number of related significant places are listed as Historic Areas. Additionally, sites important to Māori communities are given special classifications, including wāhi tapu for sites of spiritual, traditional, or ritual importance. Ten places located within the Kaikōura District are included on the New Zealand Heritage List, including seven listed as Category 2, one as Category 1, as well as a Historic Area and a wāhi tapu. Three more sites, the former Magistrate's Court, Pine Terrace, and the Elms Farm Complex, were formerly listed as Category 2 places, but have since been destroyed.

== Extant sites ==
Historic places in Kaikōura District
Name	Classification	Location	Constructed	Registered	List #	Image	Ref.
St Paul's Presbyterian Church Complex	Category 2	11 Deal Street and 104 West End, Kaikōura	1878–1879	2007	7714	The church (and adjacent manse, now demolished) was constructed in the late 1870s, with William McAra as its first minister. The church was greatly expanded in 1899, doubling its size and allowing for the installation of a pipe organ. A now-disused stable was added in 1912. Various minor modifications were made on the building over the course of the 20th century. The church remains in active use today.	
Kekerengu Station Buildings (former)	Category 2	Kekerengu Road, Kekerengu	1865–1866	2007	7713	Two long cob houses built in the mid-1860s by Jack Eves, built to accommodate the workers of a remote pastoral station. The larger of the two buildings, the workers' housing, was in use until the 1930s. The other, the former manager's residence, was later used for various purposes, including as a henhouse, cookhouse, and museum. Both buildings are currently unused.	
Wai o puka	Wāhi tapu	62 Avoca Street, Kaikōura	N/A	2007	7702	A Māori cultural site associated with the Ngāti Kurī hapū of the Ngāi Tahu iwi	
Fyffe Historic Area	Historic Area	Avoca Point, Kaikōura	Various	1998	7430	Coastal area surrounding Fyffe House (listed separately). Comprises various Māori archaeological sites, graves, and the remnants of 19th century whaling infrastructure.	
Takahanga	Category 2	Takahanga Place, Kaikōura	Mid-1980s	1994	5962	A marae of the Ngāti Kurī hapū. The marae was originally used by the Kāti Mamoe around the late 1500s. The wharenui was opened in 1992, at the same location as an earlier structure built during the early 1800s. Dedicated in honour of Maru Kaitatea, who led the hapū out of Wairarapa and claimed Kaikōura.	
Post Office Complex (former)	Category 2	1 Torquay Street and Kilarney Street, Kaikōura	1893	2006	2914	The post office building was built in 1893, replacing an earlier building constructed in 1867. Built by John Campbell from rusticated weatherboard in a standardised rectangular design, featuring a corrugated iron roof. The building was expanded in 1908 to allow for a telephone exchange. Two other buildings, the Carrier Telephone Repeater Station and Lines Depot, were constructed in 1936. The post office closed in 1985, along with its telephone exchange, one of the last large manual exchanges in operation. The buildings are currently used as a hostel.	
Fyffe House	Category 1	62 Avoca Street, Kaikōura	Mid-1840s	1990	238	Mid-1840s house, initially built to accommodate Thomas Howell, a cooper of Robert Fyffe's whaling stations in Kaikōura. George Fyffe purchased the stations following his cousin's death and lived at the house until his death in 1867, adding an expanded kitchen and a two-storey wing to the house. It was bequeathed to the New Zealand Historic Places Trust in 1980, and converted into a house museum. It is the earliest surviving building in Kaikōura.	
St James Anglican Church (former) and Churchyard	Category 2	252 Red Swamp Road, Kowhai, Kaikōura	1873	2006	1462	Built in 1873, with construction organised by Reverend Thomas Porritt. The first Protestant church in the area, it initially served both Anglican and Presbyterian worshippers. It was greatly expanded in 1882. The population of the Kowhai region steadily declined in favour of the Kaikōura township itself, leading to its deconsecration in 1987. It was leased to the Kaikoura Art Society for a period, before being sold in 2010 to a private owner.	
House	Category 2	12 Torquay Street, Kaikōura	1899	2006	1457	A small villa built by carpenter Cumming "Cum" Haswell in 1899. Heritage New Zealand described the building as a "modestly-scaled but ornamental" Edwardian residence. Since 1987, it has housed Te Whare Putea, a centre for nursing services operated by the local runaka of the Ngāi Tahu.	
Collins' Bakery Complex (former)	Category 2	49 Torquay Street, Kaikōura	1905	2006	1456	Built by baker Alfred Collins in 1905. Comprises three buildings: a house, shop, and flour store. Ran by the Collins family until 1957, when it was bought out and closed by a competing bakery. The shop is now occupied by a hair salon, while the house is rented out.	

== Former sites ==
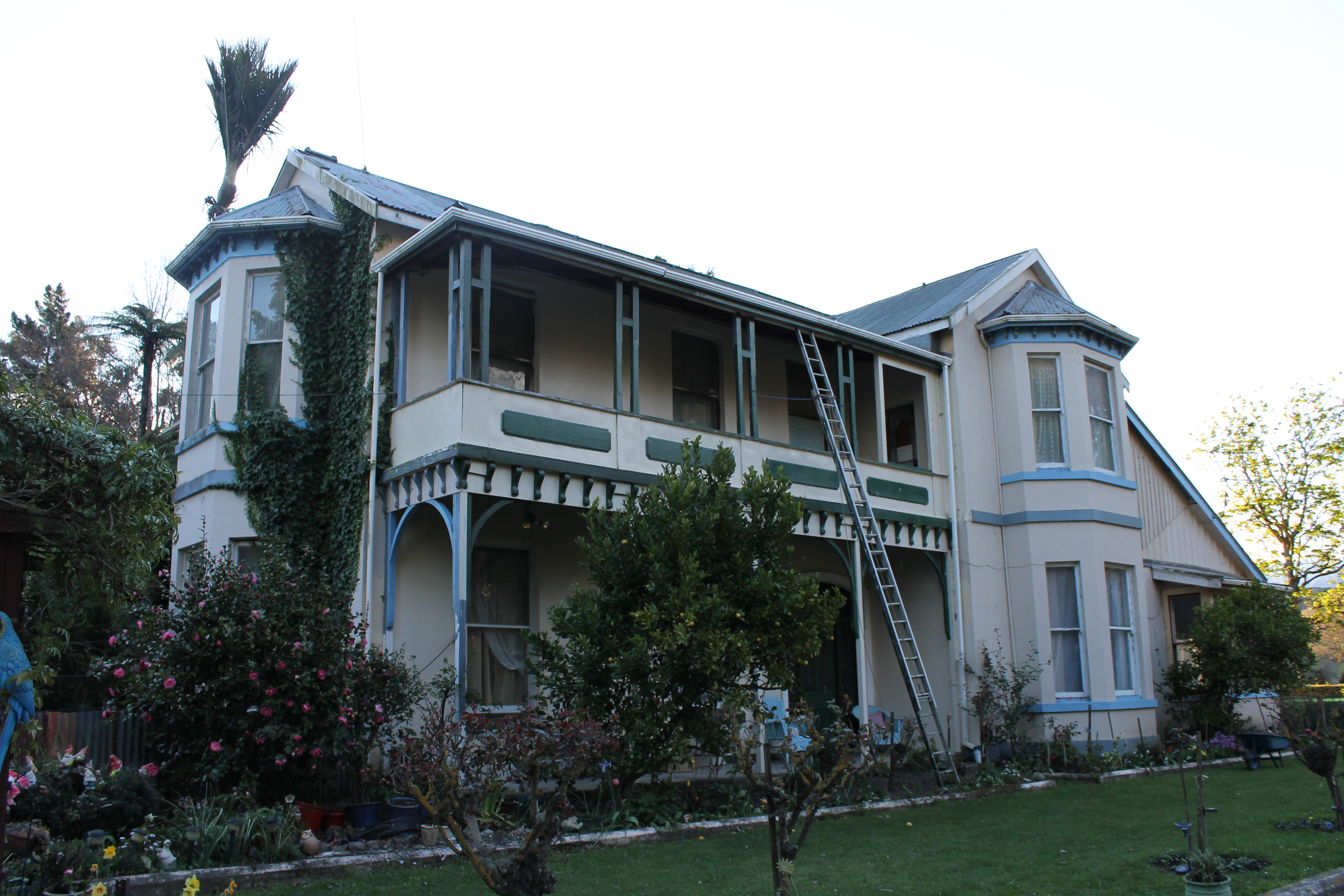
The Elms Farm, a Category 2 Historic Place, was destroyed by the 2016 Kaikōura earthquake.

These sites were formerly listed on the New Zealand Heritage List, but are no longer extant.

Former historic places in Kaikōura District
Name	Classification	Location	Constructed	Registered	List #	Notes	Ref.
Magistrate's Court	Category 2	17 Killarney Street, Kaikōura	1881	N/A	3070	Timber court house built on the site of an earlier court. Burnt down in the early 2010s.	
Pine Terrace	Category 2	620 Main North Road, Hapuku, Kaikōura	1870s	N/A	2913	Cottage constructed in the 1870s on the homestead of settler Joseph Hailes. Was occupied by the Hailes family into the 21st century. Damaged by earthquake, before its final demolition in October 2018.	
The Elms Farm Complex (former)	Category 2	Main South Road, Peketa, Kaikōura	1870s	2007	7693	Constructed around the 1870s for the brothers George and Frederick Bullen, two prominent Otago mining magnates. It consisted of a number of farm buildings, mainly built from poured concrete, a relatively rare construction material in the period. The eighteen-room concrete main house was designed by architect John Alves. During the 1940s, it was acquired by the NZ Farmers' Cooperative Association and used as a stationing ground for a Home Guard unit. It was destroyed by the 2016 Kaikōura earthquake, killing one of its residents.	
