= Nin's Bin =

Seafood business in New Zealand

Coordinates: 42.2647°S 173.8076°E

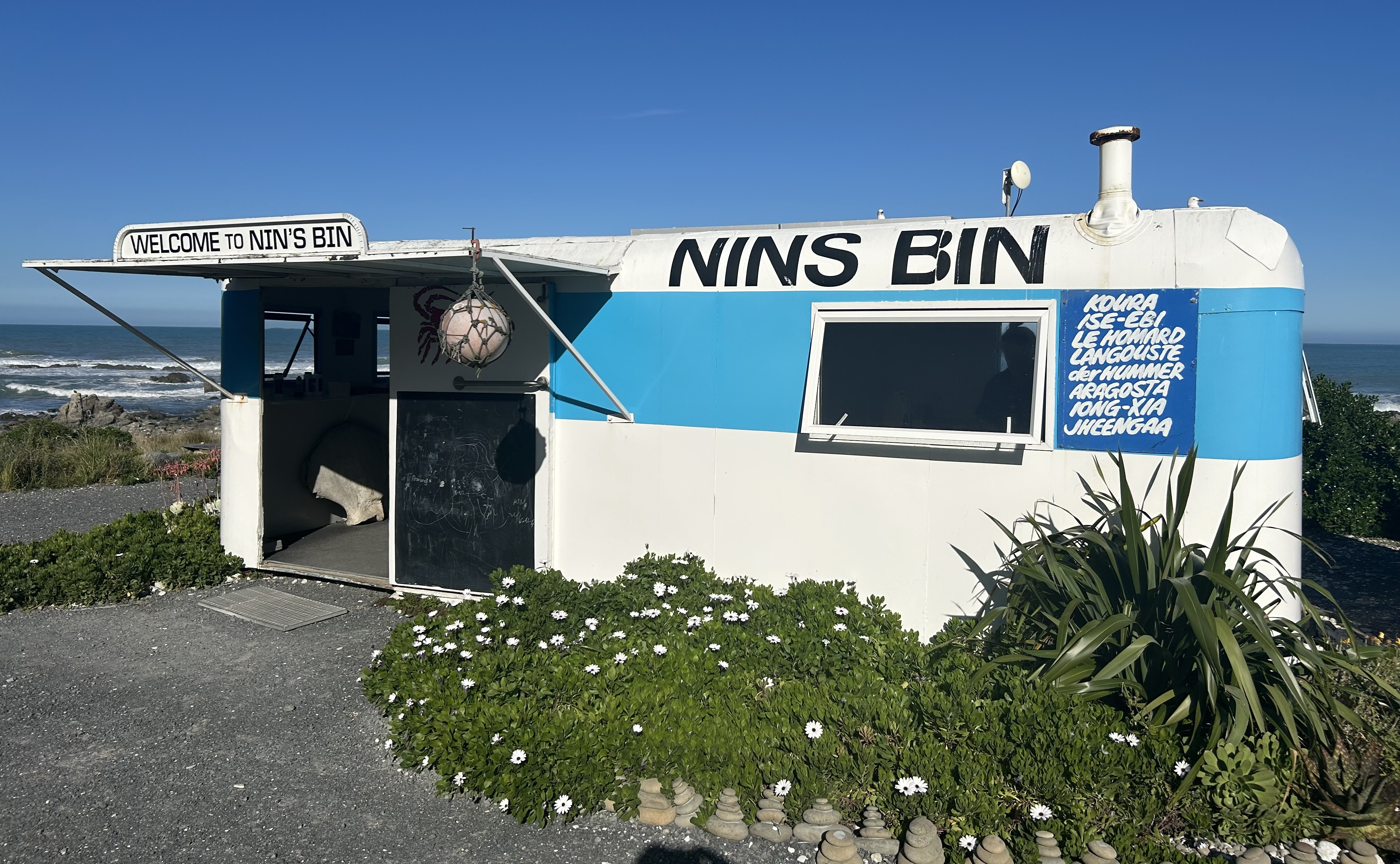
- Nin's Bin in 2026
- Company type: Private
- Industry: Food
- Founded: November 7, 1977; 48 years ago
- Website: www.ninsbin.co.nz

Nin's Bin is a business north of Kaikōura, New Zealand, that sells crayfish and other seafood. They sell the food in a white and blue caravan that is located beside State Highway 1 and is within view of the ocean. A family business, Nin's Bin was opened in 1977 and was named after a woman called Nin Matthews.

== Description ==
Nin's Bin is located on the side of State Highway 1 at Half Moon Bay, which is north of Kaikōura and near Rakautara. It is within view of the ocean. Nin's Bin sells crayfish, pāua, fish and chips, mussels, and during season, whitebait fritters. Nin's Bin is a blue and white caravan which has been described by The Marlborough Express as "iconic" and RNZ as "semi-iconic". It has been pictured on tea towels and canvas prints in gift shops. The truck is often closed if the weather conditions make fishing infeasible.

The crayfish are cooked across the road. They catch the crayfish from about 50 crayfish traps as of January 2025. The business goes fishing every day and puts what they do not sell into the traps as bait. Many customers are holidaymakers from the South Island or are tourists. Some customers text Nin's Bin their orders before picking them up.

== History ==
Nin's Bin was first opened on 7 November 1977 by Ronald Clark. Before starting Nin's Bin, he exported crayfish but became frustrated with the fluctuating prices of the animal. In response, he started the shop and named the company after a woman called Nin Matthews.

The 2016 Kaikōura earthquake caused landslides north and south of Nin's Bin, causing the caravan and Rakautara to be blocked off by road. The earthquake caused the coastline to rise by 3–5 metres (9.8–16.4 ft), resulting in the slipway to becoming unusable, so they instead started launching boats off the beach. During the time that the road was closed, Nin's Bin exported crayfish to China via a Ward-based company. For over a year after the earthquake, the area around Nin's Bin was used to store North Canterbury Transport and Infrastructure Recovery (NCITR) machinery and offices. The NCITR alliance cleared the roads that had become blocked by landslides.

Johnny Clark started managing Nin's Bin in 2016, taking over from his father Rodney. Johnny is the third generation of the family to run the business. Nin's Bin attended the October 2017 Kaikōura Seafest festival, but without the caravan. This was the first time the business sold food to the public after the earthquake. The caravan was re-opened in December 2017 with a new coat of paint and a new kitchen.

In 2018 the travel guide Lonely Planet ranked Nin's Bin as the top 7 out of 500 in a worldwide Ultimate Eatlist.
