= Puhi Puhi River =

Coordinates: 42.307892°S 173.715945°E

Location
- Country: New Zealand

Physical characteristics
- Source
  - location: Seaward Kaikōura Range
- Mouth
  - location: Hāpuku River
- Length: 16 km (9.9 mi)

The Puhi Puhi River is a river in the Kaikōura District of New Zealand's South Island. It flows southwest, roughly paralleling the Pacific Ocean coast, from sources draining from the Seaward Kaikōura Range, and reaches its outflow into the Hāpuku River 5 kilometres (3 mi) from the latter's mouth at Hapuku. One of the tributaries is the Clinton River.

== See also ==
- List of rivers of New Zealand
