= Marmaduke Bethell =

New Zealand local politician and community leader

Marmaduke Bethell (18 November 1876 – 23 February 1955) was a New Zealand local politician and community leader. He was born in Maitai Valley, Nelson, New Zealand on 18 November 1876. He was a councillor for the Amuri County in North Canterbury from 1914 to 1944, and its chairman from 1917 to 1935.

In 1935, he was awarded the King George V Silver Jubilee Medal.
