= Mayor of Hurunui =

Head of a municipal government in New Zealand

- Incumbent; Marie Black since 2019
- Style: His/Her Worship
- Term length: Three years, renewable
- Inaugural holder: John Chaffey
- Formation: 1989
- Deputy: Vince Daly
- Salary: $113,138
- Website: Official website

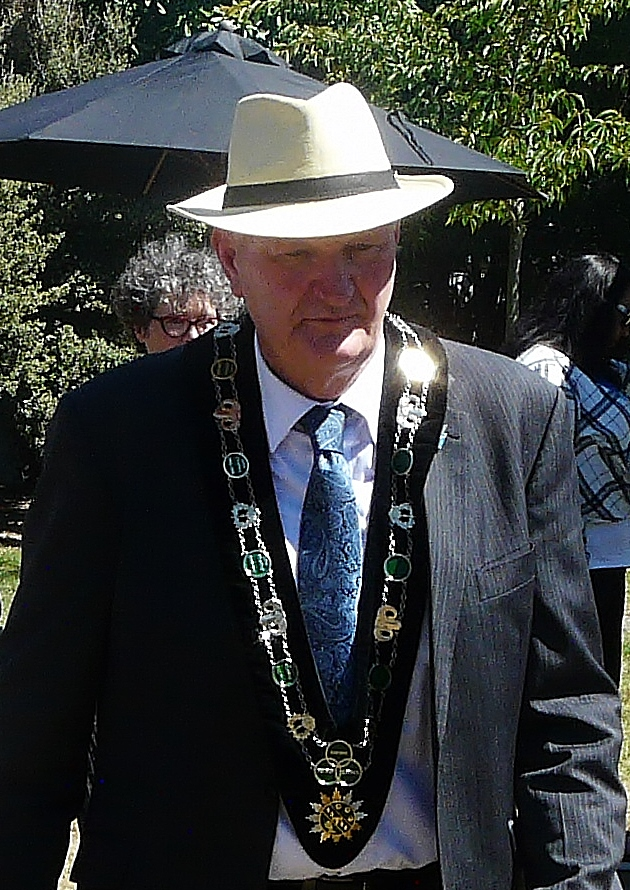
Mayor Dalley (2010–2019) wearing the mayoral chain

The mayor of Hurunui officiates over the Hurunui District Council. The current mayor is Marie Black, elected in the 2019 New Zealand local elections.

Hurunui District was formed in the 1989 local government reforms through the amalgamation of Amuri County, Cheviot County, and Ashley County. The last chairman of Amuri County, John Chaffey, became the first mayor of Hurunui District. Chaffey was still mayor in 1999. Subsequent to the October 2001 elections, Tony Arps was mayor. Garry Jackson was mayor from 2004 to 2010, when he retired. Winton Dalley was the mayor of Hurunui from 2010 to 2019.

== List of officeholders ==
Since its formation in 1989, Hurunui District has had five mayors. The following is a complete list:

	Name	Portrait	Term of office
1	John Chaffey		1989–2001
2	Tony Arps		2001–2004
3	Garry Jackson		2004–2010
4	Winton Dalley		2010–2019
5	Marie Black		2019–present
