= Takahanga Marae =

Marae in Kaikōura, New Zealand

Takahanga
- Marae
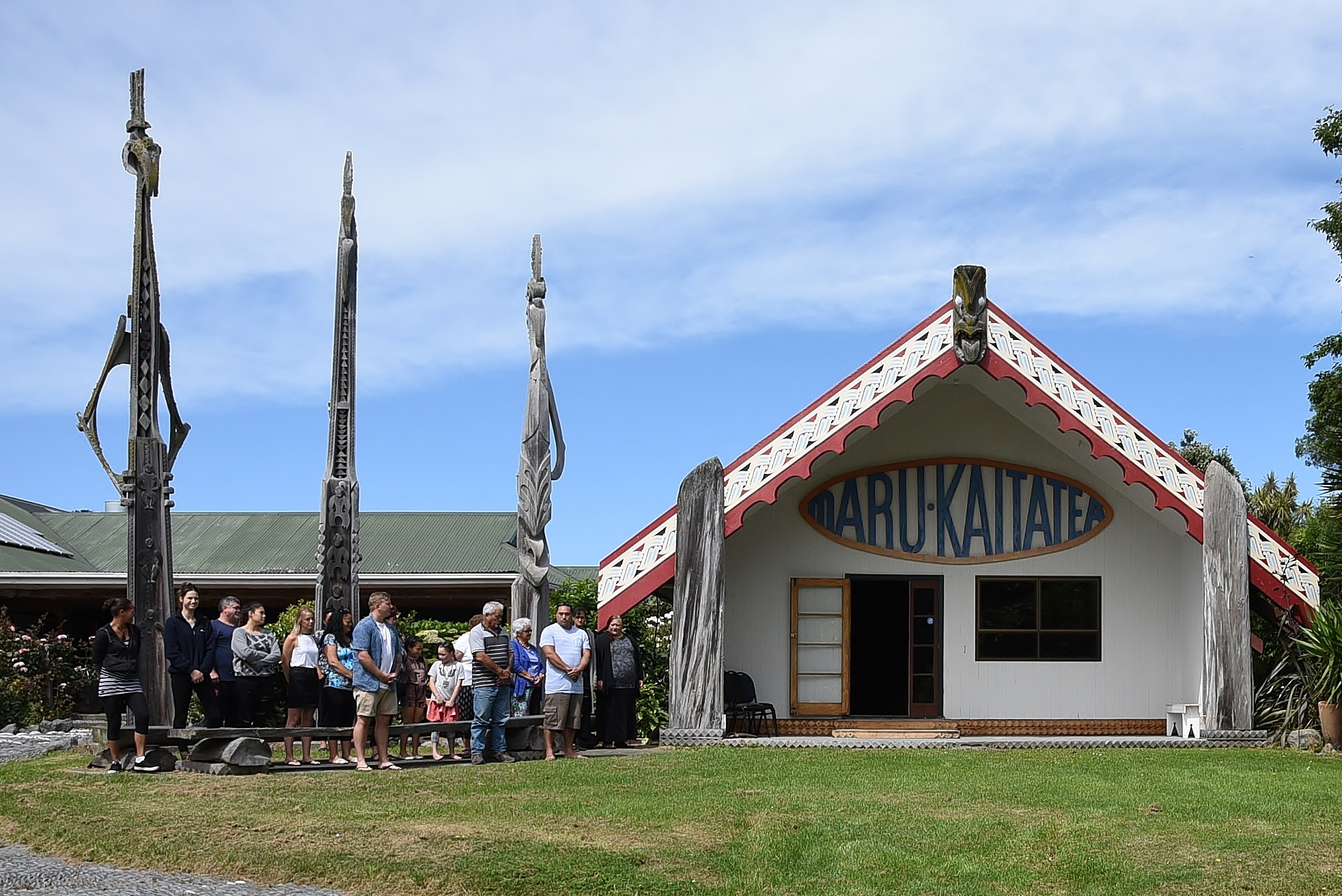
- Takahanga Marae in 2016
- Interactive map of Takahanga
- Coordinates: 42.4058°S 173.6813°E
- Location: Kaikōura, New Zealand
- Iwi: Ngāi Tahu
- Hapū: Ngāti Kuri
- Opened: January 1992
- Wharenui: Maru Kaitātea
- Wharekai: Te Poha o Tohu Raumati

Heritage New Zealand – Category 2
- Official name: Takahanga
- Designated: 2 June 1994
- Reference no.: 5962

Takahanga Marae is a marae of the Ngāti Kuri hapū of Ngāi Tahu in Kaikōura, in the South Island of New Zealand. The marae was built in the 1980s on the site of a historic pā that existed prior to European colonisation. The current marae opened in 1992, though the site has been occupied by Māori for around 450 years.

== History ==
=== Early history ===
The site on which the marae was built has been occupied for over 450 years. It was originally a pā site for Kāti Māmoe, and later became occupied by Ngāti Kuri of Ngāi Tahu.

After attacks by Te Rauparaha in the 1820s, the Māori population at Kaikōura was largely displaced, with around 1,400 (from a population of around 3,000 or 4,000) taken back to Kapiti Island as slaves. Many returned to live at Takahanga when they were eventually released during the late 1830s. During the late 1870s, most of the residents moved to Mangamaunu Pa at the mouth of the Hāpuku River after a fire destroyed much of the village. For 20 years the land at Takahanga was leased for grazing, before the Kaikoura County Council moved to acquire the land from the Māori. Land at Mangamaunu was exchanged for the land at Takahanga, and Takahanga came under the control of the Kaikoura Domain Board in 1901.

=== Modern history ===
In 1975 the 0.4 hectares (0.99 acres) of land at Takahanga was vested as a historic reserve. Around the same time, efforts began to establish a marae on the site. During the 1980s, local iwi were instrumental in establishing whale watching tourism in Kaikōura, in part to raise funds for the establishment of the marae. The marae officially opened in 1992.

The Ngāi Tahu Deed of Settlement, settling the tribe's claims under the Treaty of Waitangi, was signed at Takahanga on 21 November 1997. The settlement was signed by Prime Minister Jim Bolger and Doug Graham (representing the government), and Tipene O'Regan and Charlie Crofts (representing the iwi).

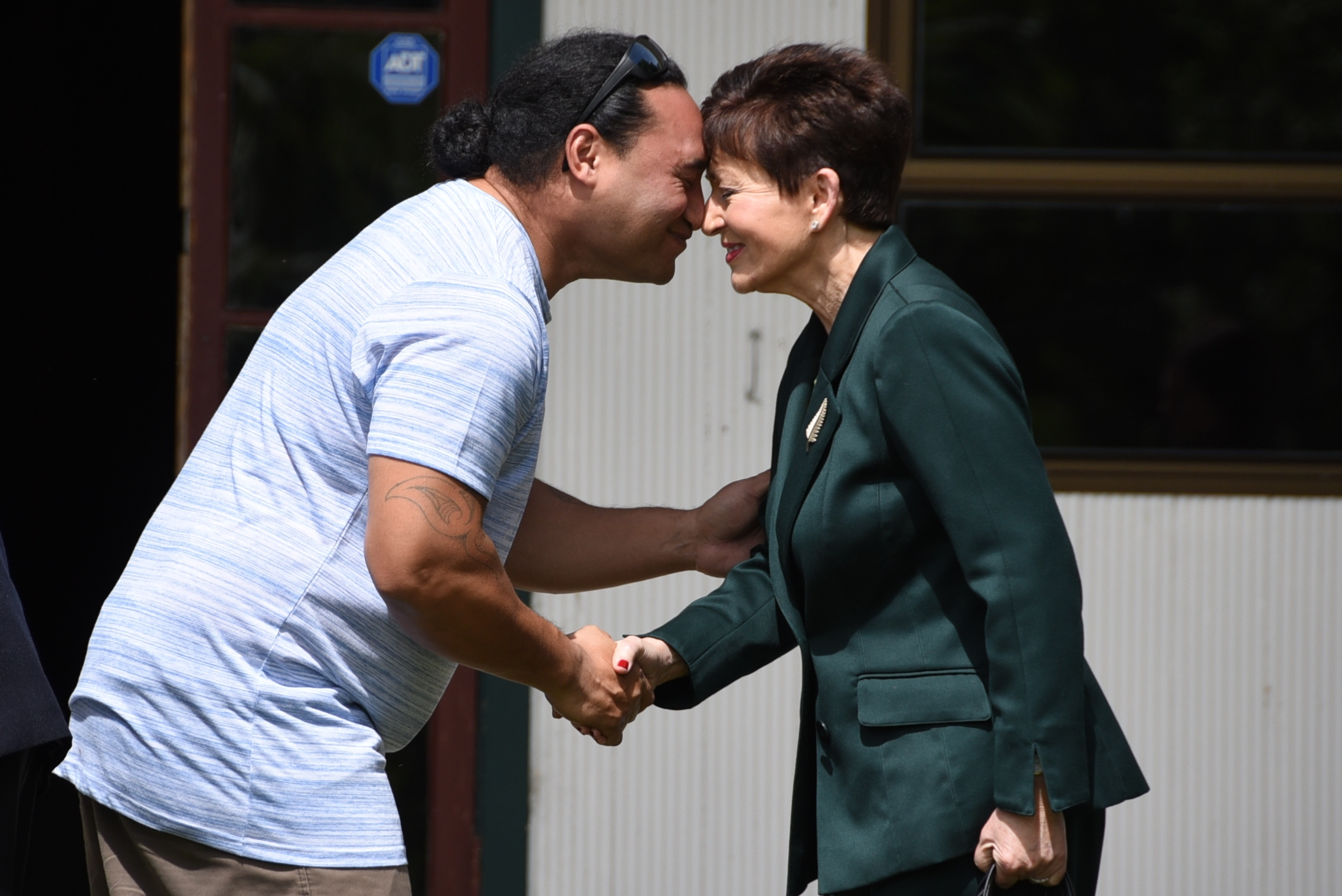
Patsy Reddy at the marae being welcomed with a hongi

After the major 2016 Kaikōura earthquake the marae became a critical welfare centre, providing food and emergency accommodation for people displaced in the earthquake. Volunteers working for the marae served 10,000 meals in the week after the earthquake to anyone who needed it, including stranded tourists and emergency workers. A month after the earthquake, the Governor-General, Patsy Reddy, visited the marae.

In July 2025, a television documentary The Bones of our Past was released, narrated by the people of Ngāti Kuri. Work on the documentary began in 2022. It was originally intended as a celebration of the 30 year anniversary of the opening of Takahanga Marae, but the celebrations did not take place because of restrictions during the COVID pandemic. The initial focus of the documentary was the art in the wharenui, but the scope expanded to include the story behind the founding of the marae, the community and the cultural revival of Ngāti Kuri. The documentary featured in the Mātaki Mai Film Festival 2025 held in Christchurch.

== Facilities ==
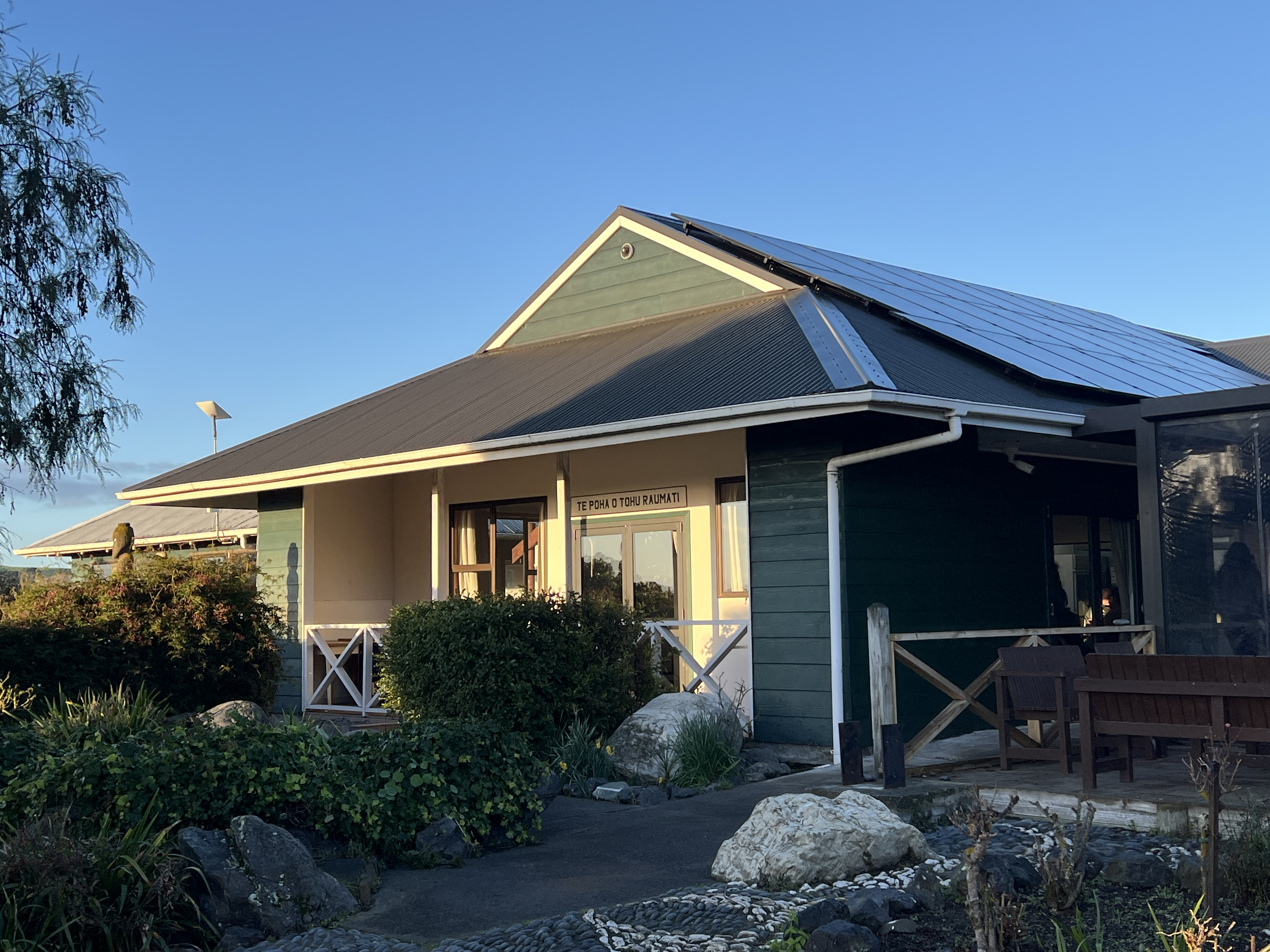
The wharekai Te Poha a Tohu Raumati

The wharenui (main hall) has a wharemoe (sleeping hall) extension; guests sleep on the floor of these buildings during a noho marae (stay at the marae). The wharenui is named Maru Kaitatea, after an ancestor, and the carvings on and in the building were overseen by Cliff Whiting. The marae sleeps up to 60 guests at a time.

The marae also features a wharekai (food hall) where meals are prepared and eaten. The wharekai is named Te Poha a Tohu Raumati, after a poha (kelp bag) of food. The reference is to a debate over who could claim manawhenua (authority) over Kaikōura. Several chiefs were challenged to eat from a tapu poha containing th first harvested food of the season—only a high-ranking chief would be able to eat from it and survive. The ancestor Maru Kaitatea was successful and took control of the site and the Kaikōura area.

The office of Te Rūnanga o Kaikōura, the governing body of the region's hapū, is at the marae.

In 2022 a whare taonga (lit. 'treasure house') was opened at the marae. The whare taonga is a safe home for many archaeological artifacts uncovered in the region following the Kaikōura earthquake.
