= Mayfair Theatre, Kaikōura =

Coordinates: 42.4079°S 173.6849°E

Mayfair Theatre
- Te Whare Toi ō Kaikōura
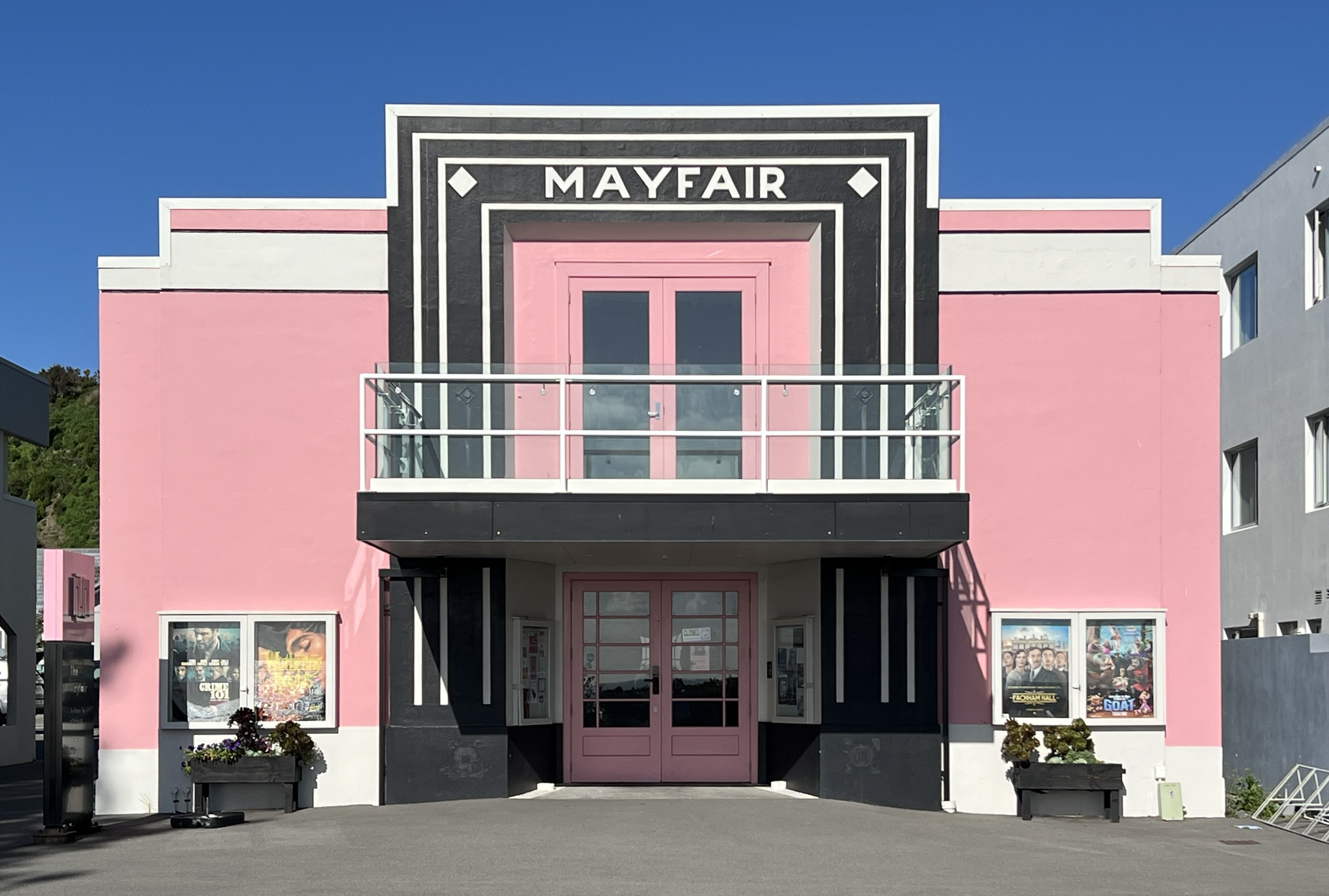
- After the 2020 restoration
- Interactive map of the Mayfair Theatre area
- Former names: Mayfair Picture Theatre
- Alternative names: Mayfair Arts & Culture Centre

General information
- Architectural style: Art Deco
- Location: 80 Esplanade, Kaikōura, New Zealand
- Opened: 21 December 1934
- Renovated: 2019–2020
- Renovation cost: $3.6m

Design and construction
- Architect: W Melville Lawry

Renovating team
- Architect: Irving Smith Architects
- Renovating firm: Cook Brothers Construction

Other information
- Seating capacity: 95 + 34

Website
- www.themayfair.org.nz

The Mayfair Arts & Culture Centre Te Whare Toi ō Kaikōura, commonly referred to as the Mayfair Theatre or just The Mayfair, is a 1934 Art Deco movie theatre in Kaikōura, New Zealand. Badly damaged in the 2016 Kaikōura earthquake, it was extensively rebuilt and reopened in November 2020.

== Early cinema in Kaikōura ==
The first film shown was in 1906, when Thomas Shaw Valentine played silent movies in the Kaikoura Hall on Brighton Street, built for a masonic lodge in 1880 and later acquired by Vern C. Hughes. Valentine had been travelling New Zealand screening silent movies, but with a film-hiring infrastructure being set up around 1910 he settled in Kaikōura and continued to screen moving pictures in the hall, accompanied by his wife on piano. By the 1920s Kaikōura's population had increased hugely with the gradual construction of the South Island main trunk line north and south of the town, and the hall was unsuitable for installing a sound system for "talkies", so Hughes decided to build a dedicated picture theatre on the Esplanade.

== Original building ==
The Mayfair Picture Theatre was designed by Christchurch architect Wilford Melville Lawry, who went on to design the 1935 Regent Theatre in Hokitika and the 1936 West Avon Flats in Christchurch. The project was led by Vern C. Hughes and the builder was Harry W. Rainey. The theatre was constructed in concrete in the "earthquake resisting" Art Deco style that prevailed in Napier after the 1931 earthquake. It was 90 feet (27 m) long and 36 feet (11 m) wide, lined in celotex and seating 180 on the ground floor with two balconies and a 36 by 16 foot stage. It opened on 21 December 1934 with a screening of 42nd Street. The Mayfair was operated by Colin Ford and his wife for many years.

By 1951 the theatre was owned by Ford, who ran it as a business despite competition from television; in 1967 he expressed his disappointment that Kaikōura could not sustain a picture theatre even two nights a week, given the arrival of the broadcast translator which improved local television reception. The theatre finally closed in 1971.

After its closure, the theatre was leased in 1972 by Kaikoura High School's Parent Teacher Association, and run on a voluntary basis as a fund-raiser, eventually generating an income of $15,000 a year. Because Colin Ford was still keen to sell, a consortium of around 25 shareholders formed a private company: the Mayfair Theatre Company Ltd. By 1983 the PTA had ended their lease as theatre profits gradually declined. The newly formed Kaikoura Community Theatre Society Inc took over the lease and ran it as a non-profit venture with an annual community grant from Trust Bank. The Mayfair Theatre Company decided to sell the theatre and recoup their investment, and the Community Theatre Inc raised $36,000 to purchase the Mayfair in 1986 on behalf of the residents of Kaikōura; the money came mostly from private donations as well as council grants and the Lottery Board. Another $18,000 was raised to renovate the theatre.

For many years the projectionists were pupils from Kaikōura High School (which caused some trouble with the projectionists' union), and the theatre ran movies for a week, with a single screening on Friday, Saturday, and Sunday nights and occasional matinées. It continued to run as a non-profit venture with an annual community grant from Trust Bank. By the 1990s the Mayfair's frontage was painted blue and red, but it later acquired a distinctive pink and black colour scheme. In November 2013 its carbon-arc lamp movie projector was replaced with a modern DCP system, new projector, and screen, purchased with $120,000 of community fundraising. The Mayfair recorded 10,000 admissions in 2014, when Kaikōura's population was only 4000.

== Earthquake damage and rebuild ==
The 7.8 magnitude 2016 Kaikōura earthquake extensively damaged the Mayfair, although the façade survived with some cracking. The digital projection system purchased three years previously was able to be salvaged. A Lottery Grants Board-funded 2017 feasibility study resulted in a plan to retain the pink and black Art Deco façade and construct a new theatre behind. Led by Kaikoura Community Theatre Trust president John Wyatt, funds was raised primarily from the Lottery Grants Board, but also Southern Trust ($300,000) and the Kaikōura Op Shop Trust ($300,000); none came from ratepayers.

The rebuild began in 2019 with the demolition of the rear of the building. The first day of excavations uncovered several archaeological sites, most significantly an urupa or Māori burial ground with around 40 individuals interred. Work was suspended and discussion began between the Mayfair Trust, archaeologists, and local Māori, facilitated by Te Runanga o Kaikōura. When agreement was reached the remains were ceremonially relocated to Takahanga Marae for reinterment, and the tapu was lifted on the site so work could continue.

Despite a lockdown during the 2020 COVID-19 pandemic the $3.6 million restoration project proceeded on schedule. The new Mayfair Arts and Culture Centre contained a main auditorium, a second 34-seat theatre with a curved screen, and an upstairs art/meeting space leading out to a balcony with ocean views. The building was reopened by the mayor of Christchurch Lianne Dalziel on 19 November 2020, with a screening in the 95-seat auditorium on 21 November 2020, and an inaugural exhibition featured works by local artist Susie Baker. The Mayfair has continued to run as a non-profit, community-owned and volunteer-run facility, with funding support from the Kaikōura District Council.
