= Hurunui District Council =

Territorial authority in New Zealand

Coordinates: 43.151971°S 172.7266471°E

Hurunui District Council Ko te kaunihera ā rohe o Hurunui

Type
- Type: Unicameral of Hurunui District
- Houses: Governing Body
- Term limits: None

History
- Founded: 6 March 1989

Leadership
- Mayor: Marie Black

Structure
- Seats: (1 mayor, ward seats)
- Length of term: 3 years

Website
- hurunui.govt.nz

Hurunui District Council (Māori: Ko te kaunihera ā rohe o Hurunui) is the territorial authority for the Hurunui District of New Zealand.

The council is led by the mayor of Hurunui, who is currently Marie Black. There are also eight ward councillors.

== Composition ==
=== Councillors ===
- Mayor Marie Black
- East Ward: Vince Daly, Fiona Harris
- West Ward: Nicky Anderson, Ross Barnes, Lynda Murchison, Mary Holloway
- South Ward: Robbie Bruerton, Geoff Shier, Michael Ward, Pauline White

== History ==
The council was formed in 1989. Its predecessors include Ashley County Council (1876–1977), Amuri County Council (1876–1989), Cheviot County Council (1876–1989), Hurunui County Council (1977–1989) and Waipara County Council (1909–1977).

In 2020, the council had 185 staff, including 21 earning more than $100,000. According to the right-wing Taxpayers' Union think tank, residential rates averaged $3,040.
