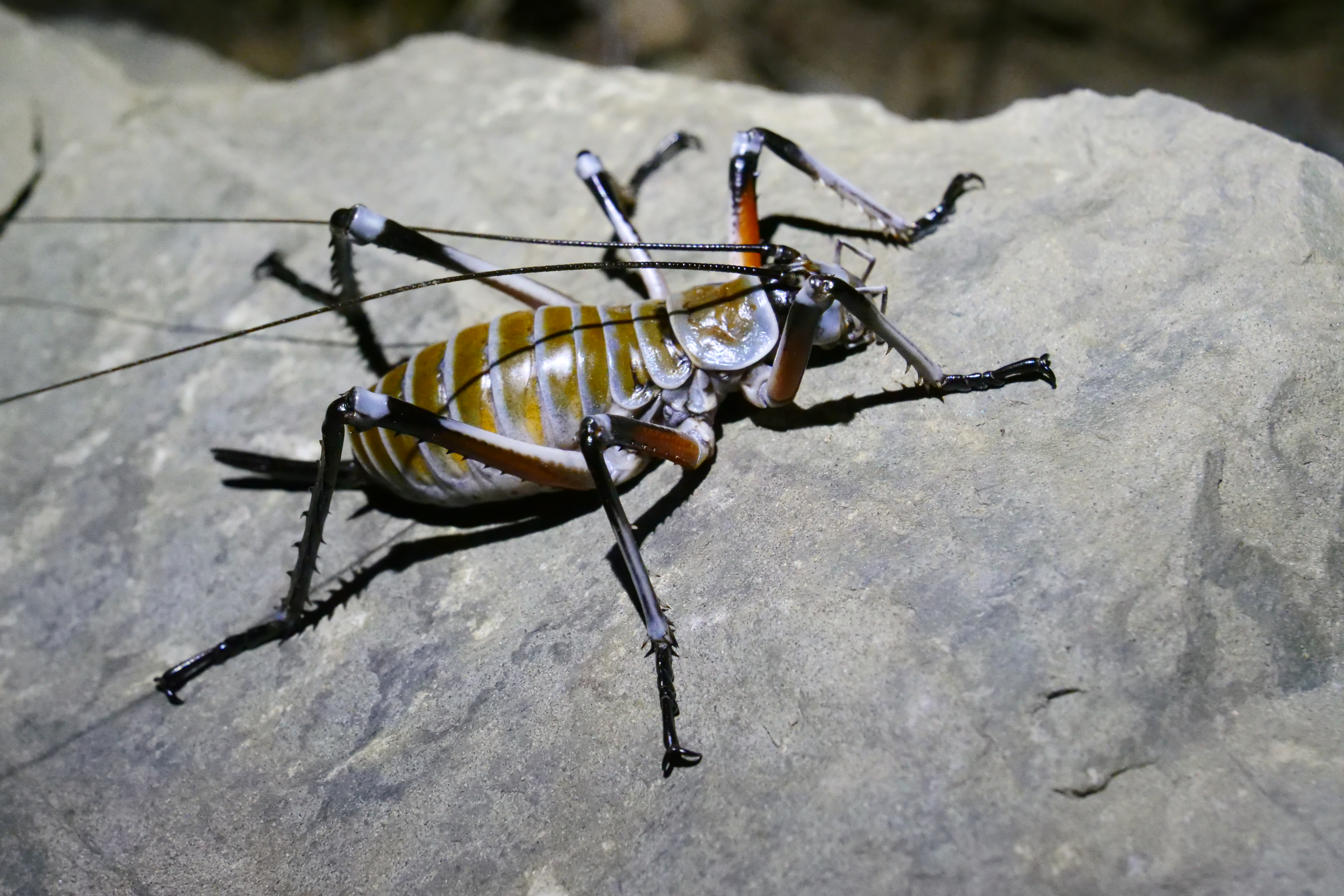

Conservation status
- Nationally Endangered (NZ TCS)

Scientific classification
- Kingdom: Animalia
- Phylum: Arthropoda
- Clade: Pancrustacea
- Class: Insecta
- Order: Orthoptera
- Suborder: Ensifera
- Family: Anostostomatidae
- Genus: Deinacrida
- Species: D. elegans

Binomial name
- Deinacrida elegans Gibbs, 1999
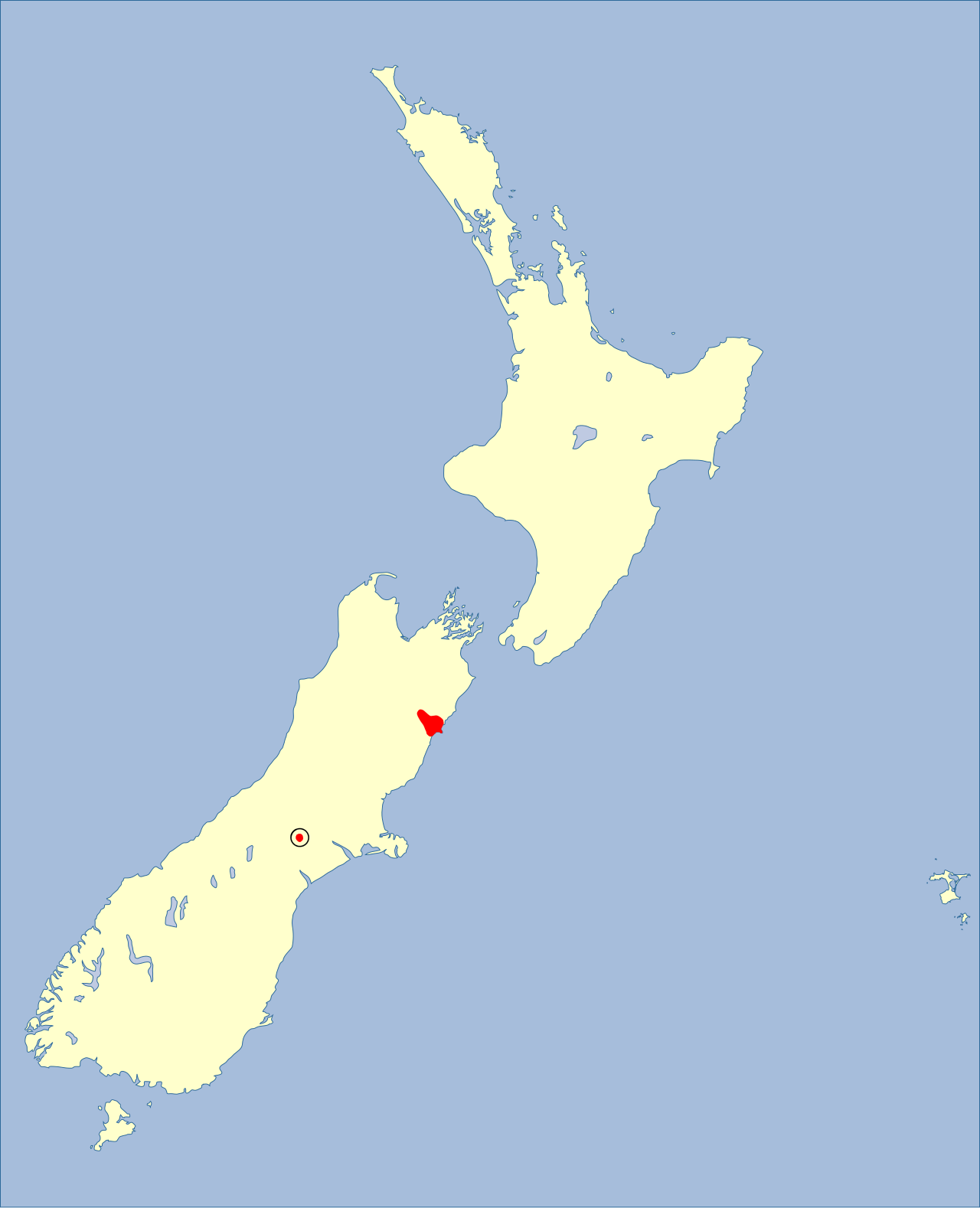

= Deinacrida elegans =

Bluff wētā

Species of orthopteran insect

Deinacrida elegans is a species of wētā in family Anostostomatidae. It is endemic to New Zealand.

== Distribution ==
Bluff wētā are endemic to New Zealand. There are two areas where the bluff wētā are found: in the Kaikōura region, both the seaward and inland ranges, and at Mount Somers / Te Kiekie, in South Canterbury. There they are locally known as the Mount Somers wētā, but are still the same species, Deinacrida elegans. This species can also be in Middlehurst Station, Inland Kaikōura Range, Hāpuku River, and Seaward Kaikōura Range. Wētā in the Kaikōura Ranges have not been discovered below 1,100 m (3,600 ft) and it seems that they are confined to alpine habitats.

Thanks to its long legs, Deinacrida elegans is a great rock climber and is found on vertical rocky bluffs, inside dark narrow crevasses and occasionally under dense overhanging plants. Their preferred habitat conditions are clean, dry, horizontal cavities about 800 and 1800m above sea level which allow the wētā to lodge themselves in as far from light as possible.

The difference in this species compared to others in New Zealand and the way they have evolved in the South Island was most likely in response to habitat diversification associated with Pliocene mountain building. Although this is where these organisms live, in some cases the cliff habitat is challenging even for those which have a planned body-type for this sort of habitat.

== Life cycle/phenology ==
Giant wētā only live for two years, and take one year to reach sexual maturity.

Bluff wētā choose to stay deep inside their dens (in the rock) during winter and the colder months, and during snow events, to conserve body heat. As the temperatures warm, the wētā move closer to the exterior and become more active, spending the most time out in the open in the summer months (late December through to February), showing that they are more active during periods of higher temperatures. This coincides with the wētā's breeding season, which requires them to be more active to find suitable mates.

Wētā find suitable mates through a process known as 'scramble competition polygyny'. This is a mating technique where receptive females wander until a male is attracted, with a chase ensuing until the female chooses the male she wishes to mate with. This is a non-aggressive method of finding a mate.

During ecdysis, the exoskeleton opens dorsally, giving way for the emergence of the animal along with its new exoskeleton. Overall this process lasts 2–3 hours.

== Behaviour ==
One defense mechanism to avoid predation or unfavorable conditions is using its legs to leap away and then roll with its legs tucked up.

New Zealand lacks any native mammals, apart from the native bats, and therefore the ecology of New Zealand's ecosystem is unique. The wētā plays a large part in this, taking on the niche of a forest floor mammal (such as a mouse) in New Zealand. This has resulted in wētā undergoing gigantism, a process in which an isolated population grows larger than its relatives due to a lack of predators and/or an abundant food source. Therefore, the wētā is thought to be the effective equivalent of a mouse in New Zealand ecosystems.

The bluff wētā has a distorted abdomen which seems to be related to its habitat where this species is compressed against crevices. It was also observed that bluff wētā gets out of its shelter by day for a sunbath.

== Conservation status ==
Under the New Zealand Threat Classification System, this species is listed as "Nationally Endangered" as of 2022. It has the qualifiers of "Biologically Sparse", "Data Poor: Size", "Data Poor: Trend", "Population Fragmentation".
