= Amuri County =

Former county in New Zealand

Coordinates: 42°46′12.23″S 172°51′4.64″E

- County of New Zealand
- 1876–1989
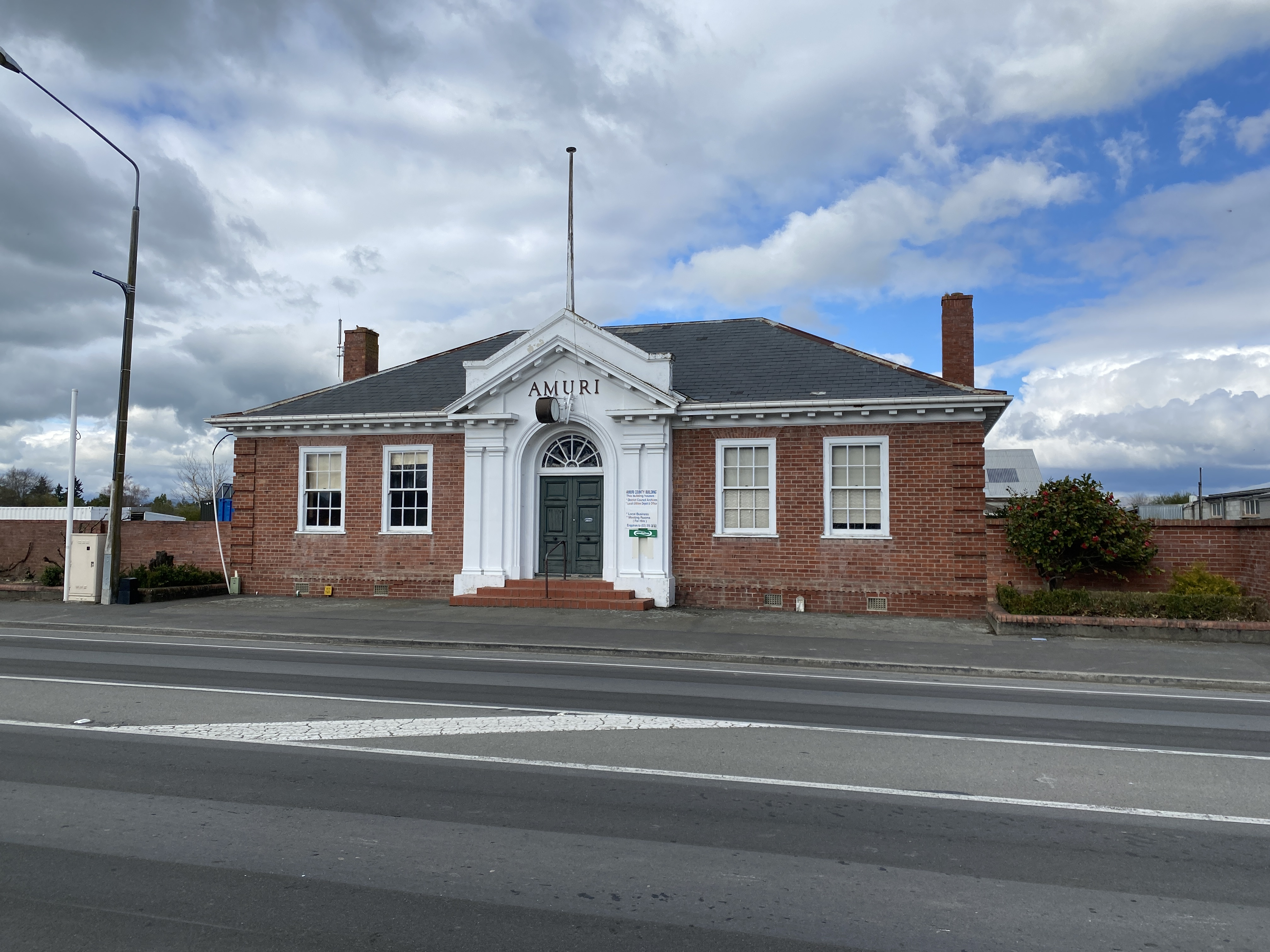
- Capital: Culverden
- History
  - Established: 1876
  - Disestablished: 1989
- Today part of: Hurunui District

Amuri County is one of the former counties of New Zealand, in the area that is now the north of Canterbury region.

During the period 1853 to 1876, the area that would become Amuri County was administered as part of Nelson Province. With the Abolition of Provinces Act 1876, Amuri County was created, taking over administration of its area in January 1877. The county council's administrative headquarters was located in Culverden, from 1890 until 1989.

Other towns in the county included Hanmer Springs and Waiau.

Amuri County existed until the 1989 local government reforms, when the Hurunui District was formed through the amalgamation of the administrative areas of Amuri County, Cheviot County and the part of Kaikoura County south of the Hundalee Hills (an area which had been the subject of a failed 1971 proposal to create a Hurunui County). The last chairman of the county, John Chaffey, became the first mayor of Hurunui District.

Although there is no settlement named Amuri, the name lives on in a number of forms: The Amuri Community Arts Council, Amuri Area School in Culverden, and the Amuri ski field near Hanmer Springs. The county itself took its name from the Amuri Plain, which surrounds Culverden. The headland of Amuri (Haumuri) Bluff lies on the Pacific coast near Oaro.

== See also ==
- Marmaduke Bethell, chairman of the county (1917–1935)
