= Clarence, New Zealand =

Town in Canterbury, New Zealand

Clarence
- Interactive map of Clarence
- Coordinates: 42°9′19″S 173°55′42″E
- Country: New Zealand
- Region: Canterbury
- Territorial authority: Kaikōura District
- Electorates: Kaikōura; Te Tai Tonga (Māori)

Government
  - Territorial Authority: Kaikōura District Council
  - Kaikōura District Mayor: Craig Mackle
  - Kaikōura MP: Stuart Smith
  - Te Tai Tonga MP: Tākuta Ferris

Area
  - Total: 59.47 km^{2} (22.96 sq mi)

Population (2023 census)
  - Total: 63
  - Density: 1.1/km^{2} (2.7/sq mi)

Clarence is a small town in Canterbury, in the South Island of New Zealand. It was named after King William IV of the United Kingdom, who prior to his accession was Duke of Clarence.

It lies on State Highway 1, about 30 km (19 mi) north of Kaikōura, near the mouth of the Waiau Toa / Clarence River.

Woodbank School in Clarence opened in 1914 and closed in February 2014 due to declining roll numbers

== Demographics ==
Clarence locality covers 59.47 km^{2} (22.96 sq mi) It had a population of 63 people in the 2023 census. Clarence is part of the larger Kekerengu locality and Kaikōura Ranges statistical areas.

== Surfing ==
Clarence has several surf breaks near the river mouth. Due to their difficulty, they are recommended for advanced to expert surfers.

== River rafting ==
River rafting trips on the Waiau Toa / Clarence River have been run commercially since 1998.

== 2016 Kaikōura earthquake ==
Clarence and the surrounding area was significantly affected by the M7.8 2016 Kaikōura earthquake and cut off for some months from the rest of the South Island. The area was briefly evacuated following a slip upstream on the Waiau Toa / Clarence which caused a build up of water, threatening flash flooding in the town.
