= Hāpuku River =

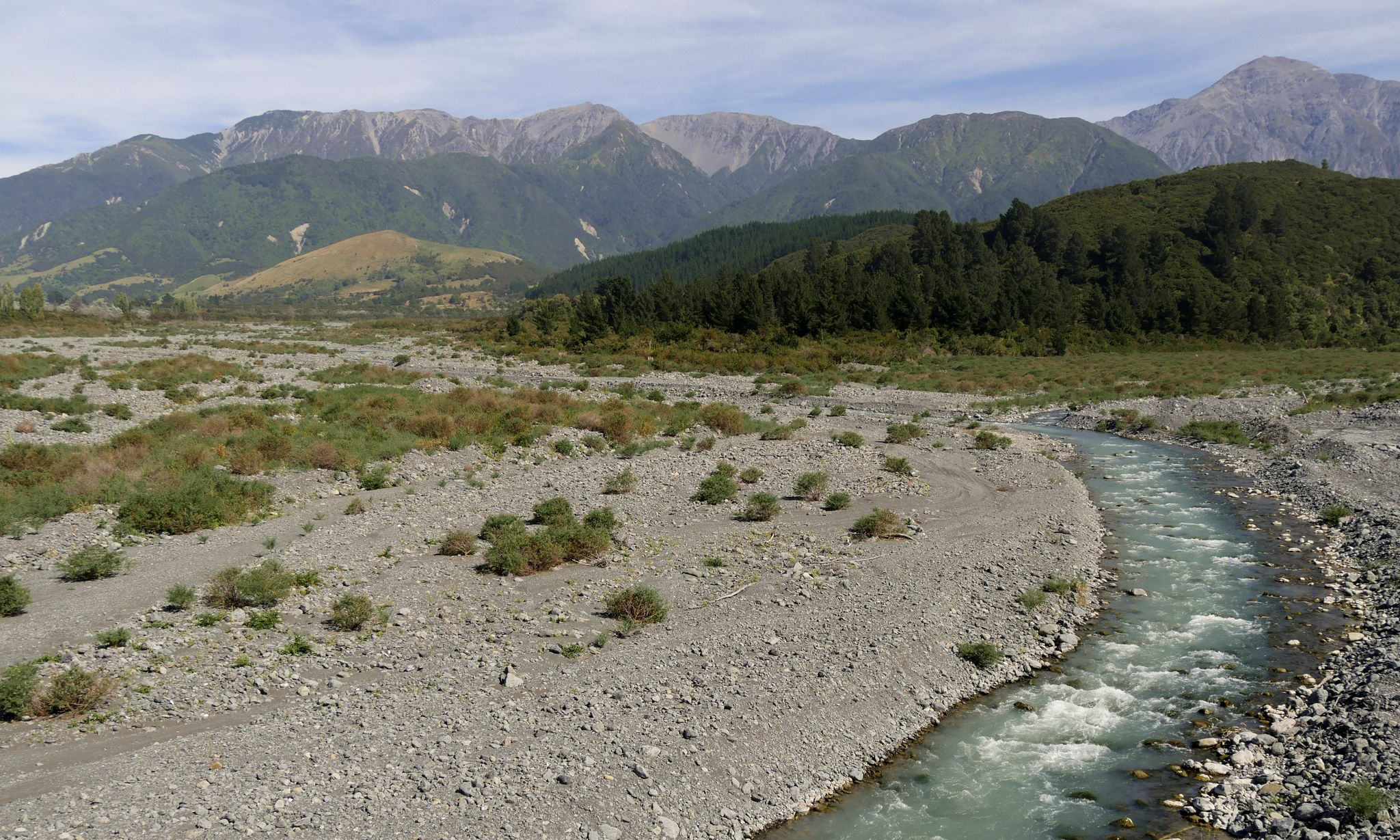
- The river from the SH1 bridge, August 2015

Location
- Country: New Zealand

Physical characteristics
- Source
  - location: Seaward Kaikōura Range
  - elevation: Highest tributaries rise at about 2,000m
- Mouth
  - location: Pacific Ocean
  - coordinates: 42°19′37″S 173°44′26″E
  - elevation: Sea level
- Length: About 20km

The Hāpuku River begins in the Seaward Kaikōura Range of New Zealand and flows south-east to enter the Pacific Ocean at Hapuku, between Clarence and Kaikōura. The name comes from the Māori word hāpuku or hāpuka, a deep-water marine fish. Its main tributary is the Puhi Puhi River.

The first road bridge across the Hāpuku was completed in 1915, although the approaches were a little later. The foundations were made 26 ft (7.9 m) deeper than originally specified in order to reach a solid footing. The current State Highway 1 bridge was constructed in 1983 and is 11 spans, 227 m (745 ft) long, and 8.6 m (28 ft) wide. The Main North Line railway bridge was constructed in 1940 and is 23 spans of 67 ft (20 m), with a total length of 1,500 ft (460 m).

While other rivers were affected by serious flooding in 1953, the Hāpuku rose only 6.5 ft (2.0 m) at the railway bridge. Presumably this was due to the short catchment, the tectonic uplift of its headwaters and the width of the braided river bed, which is a source of railway ballast. However, an 1868 flood had more of an impact upstream, leaving a 30 ft (9.1 m) bank and a 1941 flood damaged the railway.

As of March 2025, two main options for the Whale Trail cycle path from Picton to Kaikōura to cross the Hāpuku River were under evaluation: either a clip-on addition to the State Highway 1 road bridge, or a new suspension bridge.

Wildlife associated with the area include black-eyed geckos, found near the headwaters of the north branch Hāpuku River, and bluff wetas. Banded dotterels breed in the Hāpuku. Introduced species include red deer, goats (kept at low levels by culling), pigs and chamois.

There were two Department of Conservation huts in the valley; Hapuku Hut and Barratts Bivvy, linked by walking tracks. However, a slip triggered by the 2016 Kaikōura earthquake blocked the river, with water building up behind the slip and destroying Barratts Hut and Bivvy.

Hapuka railway station was open from 13 March 1944 to 29 March 1981. A passing loop and ballast siding remain.

== See also ==
- List of rivers of New Zealand
