= Rakautara =

Locality in Kaikoūra District, New Zealand

- Locality
- Interactive map of Rakautara
- Coordinates: 42°15′54″S 173°48′0″E

Rakautara is a small settlement 22 kilometres (14 mi) north of Kaikōura, on the east coast of New Zealand's South Island.

== History ==
External image
- Aniseed Village in the 1930s
- https://virtualexhibit.marlboroughmuseum.org.nz/mhs/vewebsite21/exhibit1/e10041b.html

From 1936 to 1945, during the construction of the Main North Line railway from Wharanui to Kaikōura, Rakautara had a camp for railway workers. It was located about a kilometre south of the Rakautara Stream bridge and was called Aniseed Village or Terrace Camp. It had huts, entertainment venues and a school. Land surrounding the stream was also used for the camp, with the north side of the stream, near the coast, having a dental practice, a YMCA hall and a few workshops.

Rakautara railway station opened on 13 March 1944 and closed on 16 October 1992.

The 2016 Kaikōura earthquake caused two large landslides on either side of Rakautara, which blocked off the township by road. Access to and from Rakautara required walking through railway tunnels and over land slides. Road access was restored in March 2017. The earthquake caused slope instability around Rakautara, increasing the risk of rockfall, which resulted in a few properties being deemed unsafe to occupy. As a response, rockfall protection structures were placed near five properties in 2020.

== Geography ==
A river runs through Rakautara. There is a waterfall about 2 kilometres (1.2 mi) away from State Highway 1.

There is a scenic reserve in Rakautara, named Rakautara Scenic Reserve.

== Demographics ==
As of 2016 there are about 10 houses in Rakautara.

Rakautara locality covers 72.91 km^{2} (28.15 sq mi) It had a population of 45 people in the 2023 census. Rakautara is part of a larger area including Hāpuku and Mangamaunu and of the still larger Kaikōura Ranges statistical area.
