= Cheviot County =

Former county in New Zealand

Coordinates: 42°48′46″S 173°16′26″E

- County of New Zealand
- 1876–1989
- Capital: Cheviot
- Area
- 847 km^{2} (327 sq mi)
- History
  - Established: 1876
  - Disestablished: 1989
- Today part of: Hurunui District

Cheviot County was one of the counties of New Zealand in the South Island.

During the period 1853 to 1876, the area that would become Cheviot County was administered as part of Nelson Province. With the Abolition of Provinces Act 1876, Cheviot County was created, taking over administration of its area in January 1877. The county council's administrative headquarters was located in Cheviot.

Cheviot County existed until the 1989 local government reforms, when the Hurunui District was formed through the amalgamation of the administrative areas of Cheviot County, Amuri County and the part of Kaikoura County south of the Hundalee Hills (an area which had been the subject of a failed 1971 proposal to create a Hurunui County).
