= Kaikōura District Council =

Territorial authority of New Zealand

Coordinates: 42.4028°S 173.6826°E

Kaikōura District Council Ko te kaunihera ā rohe o Kaikōura

Type
- Type: Unicameral of Kaikōura District
- Houses: Governing Body
- Term limits: None

History
- Founded: 6 March 1989

Leadership
- Mayor: Craig Mackle
- Deputy Mayor: Vicki Gulleford

Structure
- Seats: 8 (1 mayor, 7 general seats)
- Length of term: 3 years

Website
- kaikoura.govt.nz

Kaikōura District Council (Māori: Ko te kaunihera ā rohe o Kaikōura) is the territorial authority for the Kaikōura District of New Zealand.

The council is led by the mayor of Kaikōura who is currently Craig Mackle and there are seven councillors, elected at large.

In 2025, the Kaikōura District Council was classified as the smallest territorial authority in New Zealand, based on a multi-criteria analysis.

== Composition ==
=== Councillors ===
- Mayor Craig Mackle
- Councillors at large: Corrina Smith, Tony Blunt, John Diver, Vicki Gulleford, Kevin Heays, Joshua McInnes and Mark Redwood.

== History ==
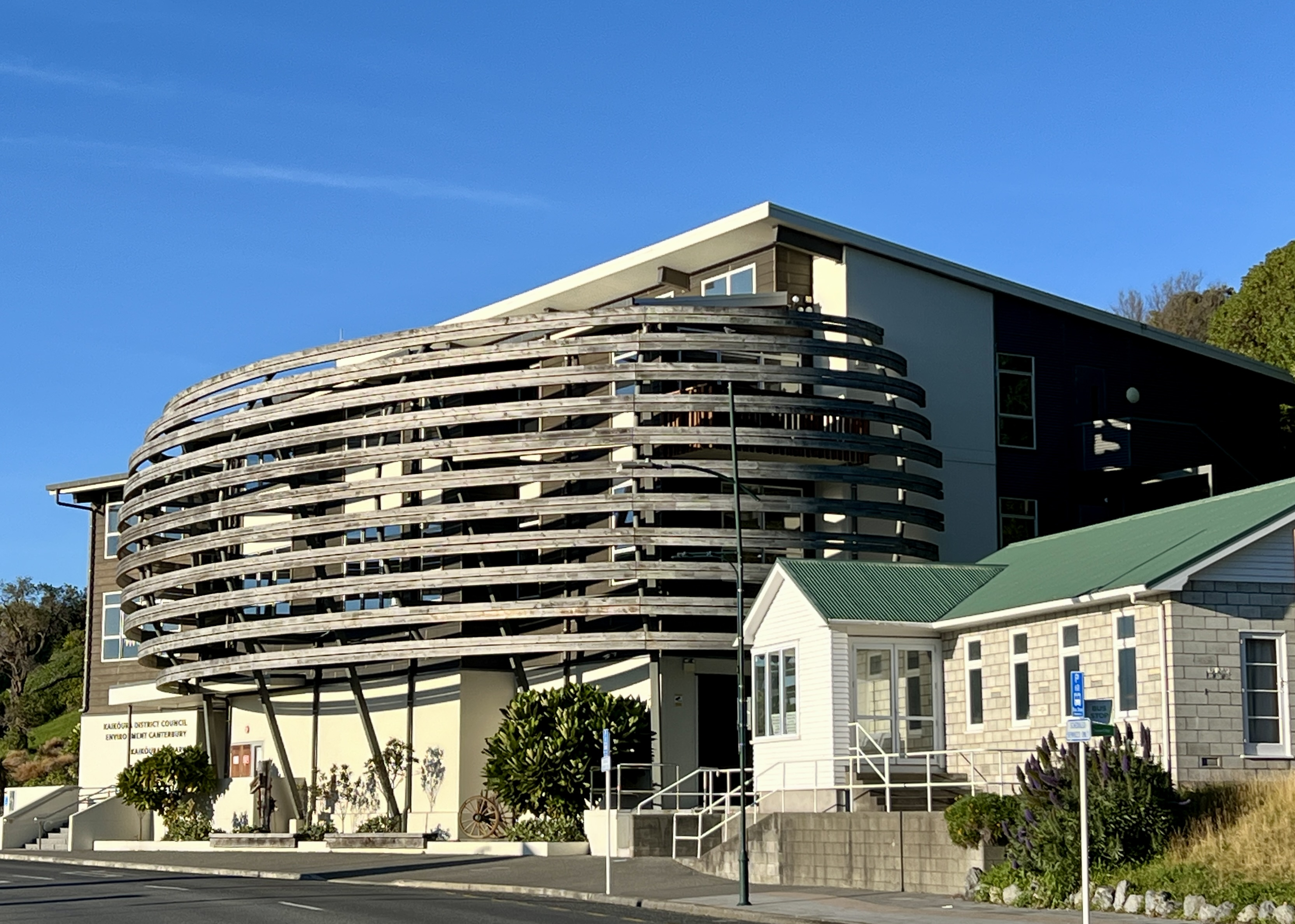
Kaikōura Civic Centre, 2025

The council was established in 1989, directly replacing the Kaikoura County Council established in 1876.

In 2020, the council had 40 staff, including 8 earning more than $100,000. According to the Taxpayers' Union think tank, residential rates averaged $2,385.

== Elections ==
- 1989
- 1992
- 1995
- 1998
- 2001
- 2004
- 2007
- 2010
- 2013
- 2016
- 2019
- 2022
- 2025
