= Mayor of Kaikōura =

Heads of a municipal government in New Zealand

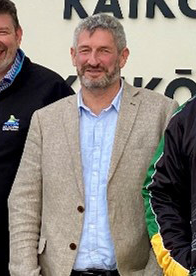
- Incumbent; Craig Mackle since 2019
- Style: His/Her Worship
- Seat: Kaikōura
- Term length: 3 years, renewable
- Deputy: Julie Howden
- Salary: $86,000
- Website: Official website

The Mayor of Kaikōura (formerly Kaikoura) officiates over the Kaikōura District of New Zealand's South Island. The district is administered by a district council. The current mayor is Craig Mackle, who was elected in 2019.

== History ==
Kaikōura District was formed through the 1989 local government reforms. The inaugural elections were part of the October 1989 local elections. There were five candidates in the inaugural election, but one of them—Paul Harnett—was disqualified as his name was not on the electoral roll. Tom Burgin, a part-time Anglican priest, was the successful candidate. In the 1992 local election, Burgin was challenged for the mayoralty by one contender, but he retained the position.

Burgin retired at the 1995 local election. There were two mayoral candidates that year, with Danny Smith being successful. Jim Abernathy was elected mayor at the 1998 local election and he held the office for two terms until the 2004 local elections. Abernathy was succeeded by Kevin Heays in 2004, who also served two terms.

Winston Gray became mayor in the 2010 local election. He was in office during the 2016 Kaikōura earthquake and the subsequent recovery process. Gray twice narrowly beat councillor Darlene Morgan for the mayoralty—in 2013 and in 2016—and then retired at the 2019 local election. There were five candidates in 2019; the mayor since then has been Craig Mackle.

== List of mayors ==
	Name	Portrait	Term
1	Tom Burgin		1989–1995
2	Danny Smith		1995–1998
3	Jim Abernathy		1998–2004
4	Kevin Heays		2004–2010
5	Winston Gray		2010–2019
6	Craig Mackle		2019–present
