= Kaikōura High School =

Secondary school in New Zealand

Location
- 1 Rorrisons Road; Kaikōura, 7300; New Zealand; 42°24′02″S 173°40′28″E

Information
- Type: State co-ed secondary (Year 7–13)
- Motto: Māori: Tama Tū Tama Ora (He who stands lives)
- Established: 1971; 55 years ago
- Ministry of Education Institution no.: 307
- Principal: Joanna Fissenden
- Enrolment: 191 (July 2026)
- Website: www.kaikourahigh.school.nz

Kaikōura High School is a state co-educational secondary school in Kaikōura, New Zealand. The first secondary school in Kaikōura was a district high school, which opened in 1903. The district high school was dis-established and Kaikōura High School opened in February 1971.

== History ==
=== District High School (1903–1971) ===
The first secondary school in Kaikōura was established in a single room building known as Ludstone School, located close to the site of the present high school. The school was designated as a district high school in 1903, but in 1905 the building was destroyed by fire. A replacement secondary school re-opened in May 1908. There was pressure from the community in 1926 and 1927 for the Minister of Education to provide more accommodation for secondary schooling. A grant for a new room for secondary classes was approved in May 1928. In 1950, there were 79 pupils on the roll of the secondary school, with 293 attending the primary school. A new school block for the secondary department was opened in 1955, providing two new classrooms, a headmasters office and a staff room.

The eighty-fifth anniversary of the founding of the school, and the fifty-fifth anniversary of the establishment of the secondary department were celebrated at a reunion in August 1958.

The Minister of Education approved the establishment of a form 1 to form 6 high school at Kaikoura with effect from 1 February 1971.

=== Kaikōura High School (from 1971) ===
In May 1977, the Minister of Education announced that plans for a new Kaikōura High School were ready to go to tender. Secondary students moved into new buildings in 1979, leaving the existing site for primary students.

In 2000, the school received additional funding of $60,000 to establish a junior sports academy as an innovative approach to target students at risk.

The Education Review Office issued critical reports about the school over the period 1999 to 2004, raising concerns about teaching approaches, lower-than-average results in science and English, and failure to meet the needs of Māori students. In September 2004, the school's board of trustees was dissolved by the Minister of Education, and a commissioner was appointed to run the school. A new principal was appointed in July 2006, as part of the process of returning the school to self-management.

In 2007, Māori students were 35% of the school's roll. The school introduced compulsory lessons in te reo for all its year 7 and 8 students in 2008

Two major renovations of school buildings were completed in 2015, including the upgrade of the school's whare and library.

A limited statutory manager with employment and financial powers was appointed to the school in July 2015. A new principal was appointed in late 2015.

The school was closed following the Kaikōura earthquake on 14 November 2016 but was cleared of damage and re-opened 30 November 2016. Works undertaken following the earthquake included seismic strengthening of the school gymnasium.

== Flooding risk ==
In 2021, modelling of coastal flooding risks to schools across New Zealand showed that Kaikōura High School was vulnerable to flooding with a sea-level rise of between 51 and 100 cm.

== Enrolment ==
As of July 2026, Kaikōura High School has roll of 191 students, of which 61 (31.9%) identify as Māori.

As of 2026, the school has an Equity Index of 475, placing it amongst schools whose students have above average socioeconomic barriers to achievement (roughly equivalent to decile 4 under the former socio-economic decile system).

== Notable alumni ==
- Thomas Cooke – soldier, Victoria Cross recipient
- Ed Latter – politician and diplomat
