= Kaikoura County =

Coordinates: 42.40°S 173.68°E

- County of New Zealand
- 1876–1989
- Capital: Kaikoura
- History
  - Established: 1876
  - Disestablished: 1989
- Today part of: Kaikoura District

Kaikoura County was one of the counties of New Zealand on the South Island.

== History ==
During the period 1853 to 1859, the area that would become Kaikoura County was administered as part of Nelson Province. After a vote in 1859, the area that would become Kaikoura County was administered as part of the new Marlborough Province. With the Abolition of Provinces Act 1876, Kaikoura County was created, taking over administration of its area on 1 January 1877. The county council was based in the town of Kaikoura (now spelt Kaikōura), on the Pacific Ocean coast of the South Island.

Kaikoura County existed until the 1989 local government reforms, when it became the Kaikoura District. The Kaikoura District did not include the part of Kaikoura County south of the Hundalee Hills, which was given to the new Hurunui District created on the same date. This area had been the subject of a failed 1971 proposal to create a Hurunui County.
