= Fyffe House =

House in Kaikōura, New Zealand

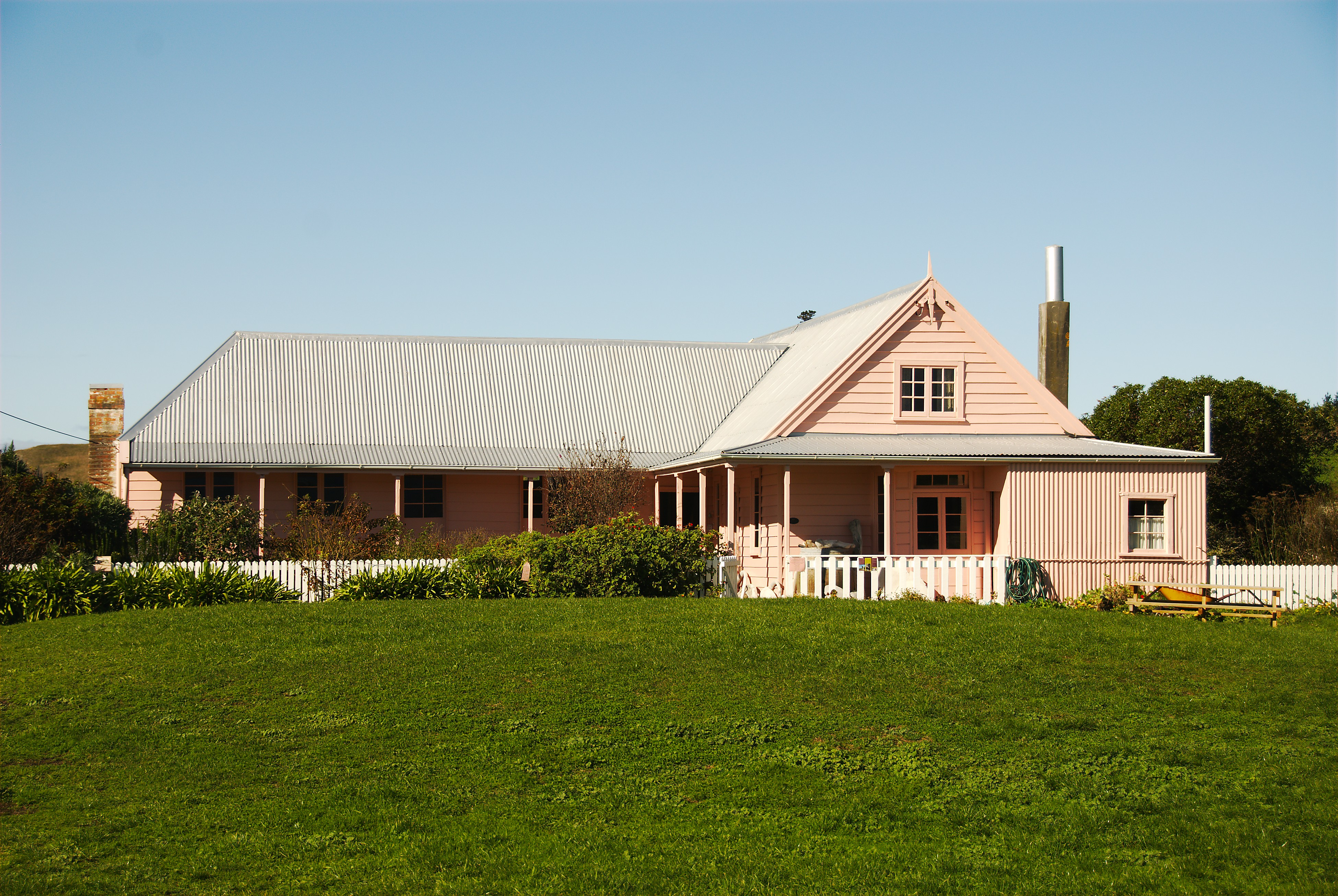
- Interactive map of the Fyffe House area

General information
- Type: House
- Location: 62 Avoca Street, Kaikōura, New Zealand
- Coordinates: 42°25′0.3″S 173°42′25.42″E

Website
- www.visitheritage.co.nz/visit/upper-south-island/fyffe-house

Heritage New Zealand – Category 1
- Designated: 15 February 1990
- Reference no.: 238

Fyffe House is a heritage building in Kaikōura, in the South Island of New Zealand. It is the town's oldest surviving building and a remnant of a whaling station established by Robert Fyffe in 1842. It is listed by Heritage New Zealand as a Category 1 Historic Place.

Fyffe arrived in New Zealand in 1836 and established a whaling station at Te Wai-o-puka, a headland of the Kaikōura Peninsula. It is sheltered from southerly storms by high peninsula hills with views across the bay to the Seaward Kaikōuras. Fyffe was financed into the venture by the Wellington merchant John Wade, and built the house on piles made from the vertebrae of a tohorā (Southern right whale). Māori had occupied the area fishing and hunting since the 12th century, and following the establishment of the whaling on the peninsula, local Māori worked on the whaling station as boat crew.

Within 10 years Fyffe had established a prosperous shore whaling business and was farming about 2,000 sheep. As the whaling business declined by 1849, he had turned to farming, initially acquired by squatting, and when he died in 1854 his estate was valued at over £6,000.

Thomas Nowell was the whaling station's first cooper, making casks or barrels for whale oil and it is his house of two rooms and a hipped roof using tōtara hand-split shingles, which is considered to be Fyffe House's original cottage, the eastern wing, now the curator's quarters. Robert Fyffe had also built a shearing and woolshed using whale ribs as posts and crossbeams supporting a roof of toetoe, and constructed sheep yards with pieces of whale bone. His assortment of buildings became known as Fyffe's Village forming the social and business centre of Kaikōura until the mid-1860s.

In December 1853, Fyffe's cousin (Note: Some sources state that George was Robert's nephew, but they were both grandsons of John Fyffe and Anna Scot.) George Fyffe arrived in Wellington from Scotland, having accepted Robert Fyffe's invitation to join him at Kaikōura. However in late April 1854 the Fidèle capsized and was wrecked on a voyage to Wellington with a cargo of whale oil, and Robert Fyffe was drowned. As he had not yet changed his will in favour of George, the executor of Fyffe's estate published an advertisement seeking his heirs. The advertisement was seen by Fyffe's widowed sister Elizabeth Laird who was living in New York at the time. She attempted to locate their brother James Fyfe who was also supposed to be living in New York. Following a demand in 1861 by Fyffe's executor that any heirs appear in person at the solicitor's office in Wellington, Laird and her family arrived in New Zealand in 1862. Laird inherited £18,000 pounds and her son William Laird went to Kaikōura to assume control of Fyffe's property.

George bought the whaling equipment and the 'right to whale' in 1854. He purchased 7,000 acres of land, and used pit-sawn native timbers, including kahikatea, tōtara, matai, rimu and miro and an Australian eucalypt to construct an adjoining two-storeyed gable roofed west wing to Fyffe House. This was built on foundations of some whale bone piles, local mudstone and limestone. While digging the foundation for his adjacent store in 1857 George found what is believed to be New Zealand's largest moa egg, now housed in Te Papa Tongarewa, the Museum of New Zealand. George Fyffe largely lived in Fyffe House until, then in financial difficulties, he fell off rocks and died in 1867. His wife Catherine died a few years later. There were no children.

Fyffe House was bought by Joseph Wilkinson Goodall, (1835–1911) former district constable, Clerk of the Court and Registrar of Births Deaths and Marriages, who then took over management of Kaikōura Wharf. He built the Pier Hotel on the seaward side nearby in 1885; it was moved in 1909. The house had few changes in Goodall's time. When he died in 1911, the land was subdivided and James Johnston bought it in 1920. His son, James Allen (Jimmy) Johnson, a former whaler, took it over in 1922 and Joseph and Maud Low and their eight children lived there. Jimmy Johnson sold the house in 1935 to Joseph Soutar, who lived in a small bach on the property while Maud remained in the house. On his death in 1943, Soutar left Fyffe House to Maud Low, and she bequeathed it to her youngest son, George Low in 1951. A former fisherman, he used most of the house for storage and kept a boat in the parlour.

George Low died in 1980 and bequeathed the house to the New Zealand Historic Places Trust, which has restored it as a house museum, one of New Zealand's oldest authentic cottages and part of the heritage of whaling, farming and commercial life of the district.

The Trust's conservation has taken many years of careful historical analysis and painstaking repair work, both inside and out.When the hipped framing and timber shingles still in place were being examined, they showed clearly that the east wing once stood alone.

The exterior of Fyffe House was repainted in its original pink colour. The original paint was believed to be made from red lead, white lead and whale oil. The walls are timber framed with lath and plaster interior linings. Cavities were filled with a mix of earth and straw, visible in an upstairs cupboard. Joinery in some windows and doors is in excellent condition, rare examples of mid-19th century work. Wallpapers were stripped back. Chairs and the brass bedstead were restored, and a large lock on the front door. The bannisters were returned to their original wood. Some of the old lath and plaster can be seen under glass in one bedroom. At the back of the house is some original wooden guttering and the remains of a 1100 mm deep bread oven. The house provides an insight into the simple decorative techniques and finishes of buildings in the early history of European settlement.

== See also ==
- List of historic places in Kaikōura District
- Whaling in New Zealand
