= Whale Watch Kaikōura =

New Zealand ecotourism company

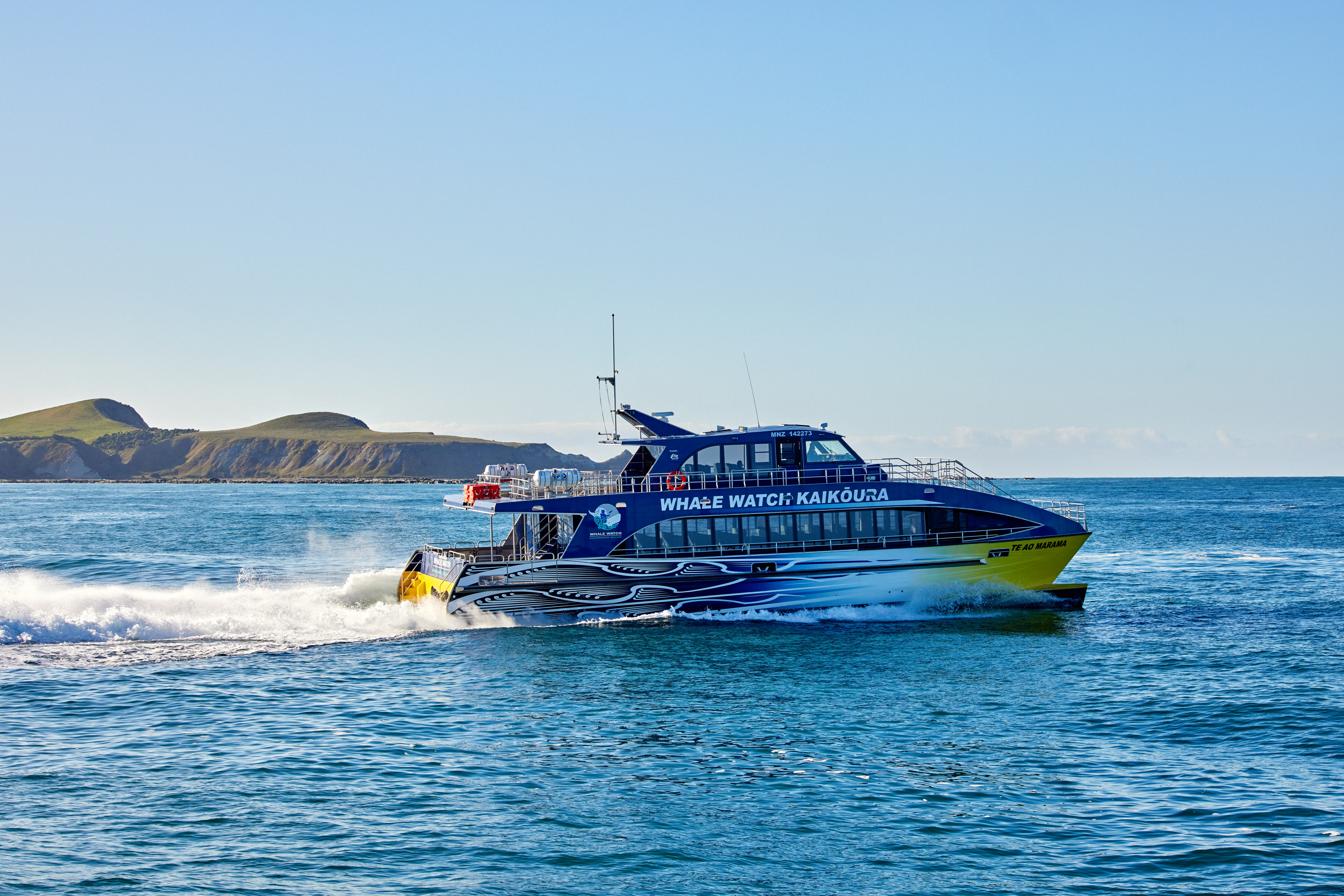
- Whale watching boat Te Ao Marama
- Type: Private
- Industry: Ecotourism
- Predecessors: Kaikoura Tours
- Founded: 1989
- Headquarters: Kaikōura
- Revenue: 7,850,000 New Zealand dollar (2021)
- Total assets: 22,009,000 New Zealand dollar (2021)
- Number of employees: 32 (2021)
- Website: whalewatch.co.nz

Whale Watch Kaikōura is an ecotourism company based in Kaikōura, a small town on the east coast of the South Island of New Zealand. The company offers marine wildlife tours focussing on sperm whales and other cetaceans, using vessels operating from the marina at South Bay. The company was originally established as Kaikoura Tours, and was formed by members of the Ngāti Kuri hapū, a sub-tribe of the South Island based Māori iwi Ngāi Tahu. It offered its first whale watching tours in July 1989. By 2009, the company was taking between 90,000 and 100,000 people a year on whale-watching trips, and the business was the largest employer in Kaikōura with over 70 staff during the peak season.

A case involving Whale Watch Kaikōura and the issue of permits for whale watching was heard by the New Zealand Court of Appeal in 1995. The court decision, known as "The Whales Case", has subsequently been referenced in other litigation involving the principles of the Treaty of Waitangi. Since 1990, Whale Watch Kaikōura has been the only ecotourism operator with permits for whale watching from a vessel off Kaikōura. The business has been owned and operated by Ngāti Kuri since its establishment in 1989, and has won multiple national and international awards.

== Geographic setting ==
The Kaikōura Canyon is a geologically active submarine canyon located southwest of the Kaikōura Peninsula. The canyon descends into deep water and merges into an ocean channel system that can be traced for hundreds of kilometres across the deep ocean floor. At the head of the canyon, the depth of water is around 30 metres (98 ft), but it drops rapidly to 600 metres (2,000 ft) and continues down to around 2,000 metres (6,600 ft) deep where it meets the Hikurangi Channel. Studies of the Kaikōura Canyon have found that it is a highly productive ecosystem with 10 to 100 times the density of marine life found in other deep sea habitats. Sperm whales can be seen close to the coast, because the deep water of the Kaikōura Canyon is only one kilometre (0.62 mi) off the shoreline to the south of the Kaikōura Peninsula.

== Sperm whales ==
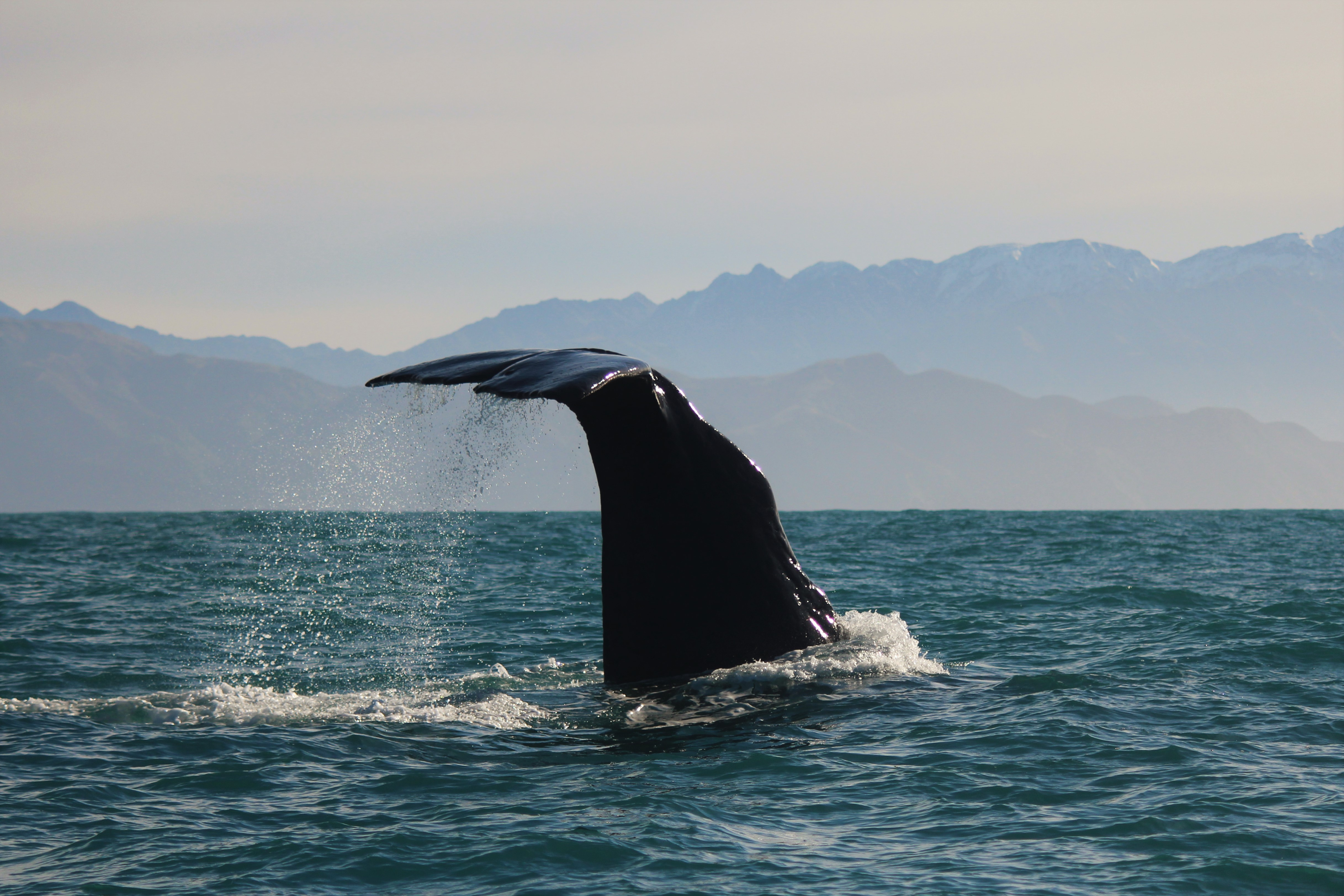
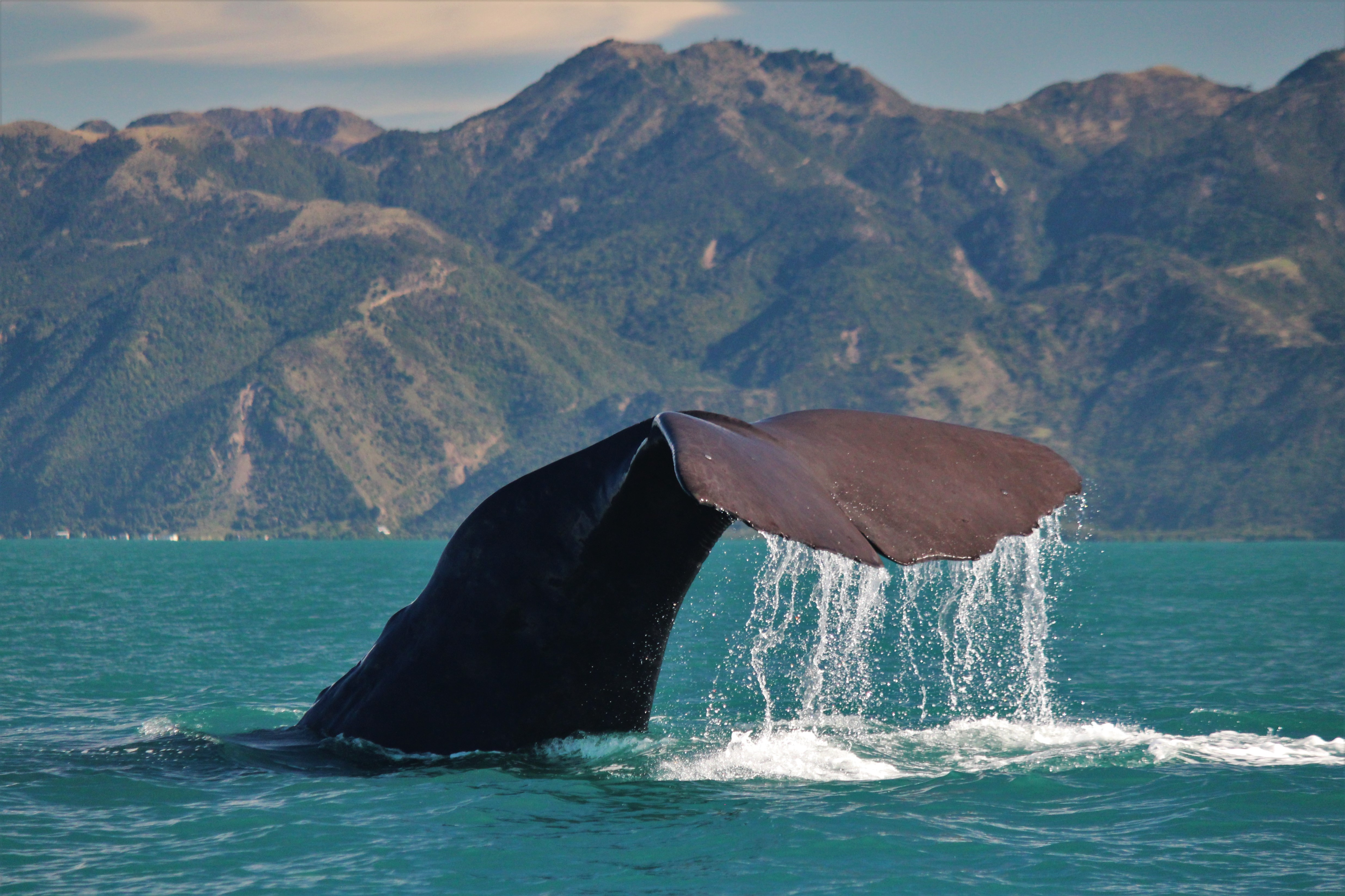
Sperm whales (Physeter macrocephalus) viewed from Whale Watch boats

The sperm whales seen off the Kaikōura coast are almost entirely sub-adult or adult males. They typically spend around 25% of their time resting on the surface, with the remaining 75% of time spent in deep foraging dives.

Male sperm whales are sighted year-round at Kaikōura but individual animals are not truly resident. The Kaikōura region represents only a small portion of the total range of the animals that are seen. A study reported in 2021 examined the records of observations of sperm whales off Kaikōura using photo-identification data collected over 27 years. The analysis showed that although the numbers of sperm whales observed in winter has been relatively constant over the period, there has been a steady decline in the abundance during summer periods.

In 2024, the conservation status of sperm whales in New Zealand was changed from Data Deficient to At Risk – Declining. The threat classification report noted the decline in the number of sperm whales recorded off the Kaikōura coast since 1991, but observed that these whales represent only a small proportion of the total population in New Zealand waters. It is unclear whether the decline in sperm whales off the Kaikōura coast is an indicator of decline in the population elsewhere.

In addition to sperm whales, humpback whales and southern right whales may be seen off the Kaikōura coast, and rare beaked whales and a blue whale have also been seen.

== History ==
Māori have occupied the area around Kaikōura for over 800 years and have relied on the resources available from the ocean. The name Kaikōura means 'meal of crayfish' (kai – food/meal, kōura – crayfish) and the crayfish industry still plays a role in the economy of the region.

The present town owes its origin to richness of marine life in the ocean, since it initially developed as a centre for the whaling industry. Robert Fyffe was the first European to settle in the area, establishing a whaling station on the Kaikōura Peninsula in 1842. The peninsula provided a high lookout point for observing whales so that harpoon vessels could be sent out. The last whaling station at Kaikōura closed in 1922, although whaling in the area continued from vessels based in other locations. In the 1960s, the Perano whaling station in Cook Strait, facing a ban on catching humpback whales in the southern hemisphere, switched to sperm whales, and took 248 between Cook Strait and Kaikōura over 1963–64. The last whale taken by a New Zealand commercial whaling vessel in New Zealand waters was a male sperm whale killed in 1964, offshore from Kaikōura.

Whale watching as a commercial ecotourism venture in Kaikōura was started by the Ngāti Kuri hapū, a sub-tribe of the South Island based Māori iwi Ngāi Tahu, under the leadership of Bill Solomon. It was established as a means of addressing poor economic conditions and unemployment in the town. In 1987, five local Māori families mortgaged their homes and used their cars as collateral for loans to help raise funds to set up the venture. A company Kaikoura Tours Limited was launched on 16 April 1989. The business leased the Kaikōura railway station and converted it into their operational headquarters. The building was renamed as the Whaleway Station and the access road renamed as Whaleway Road.

Their first vessel was a six-metre inflatable boat that could take eight passengers to watch whales, with the first tours offered in July 1989. In 1990, Kaikoura Tours bought out a separate whale-watching enterprise, Nature Watch Charters that also held a permit from the Department of Conservation for commercial whale watching. The business then held the only permits for watching whales from a vessel at Kaikōura. However, the two companies operated as separate entities, with Kaikoura Tours providing a Māori culture focus, and Nature Watch emphasising wildlife. Despite the acquisition of its competitor, the business traded at a loss for the first three years.

By 1992, the business was employing 35 people, and taking 35,000 to 40,000 visitors a year out to see the whales. Profits from the business helped the Ngāti Kuri hapū to fund the construction of Takahanga Marae on an ancestral site overlooking Kaikōura.

During a visit to Kaikōura in March 1993, the British zoologist and writer Mark Cawardine made the observation "Kaikoura is the only place in the world where you can see sperm whales so close to shore". He also noted that in other parts of the world, there could be large numbers of boats around a single whale, but that was not the case in Kaikōura. In December 1994, a television documentary A Whale's Tale about the history of the whale-watching business in Kaikōura was broadcast on the New Zealand national television network TV1.

In 1995 Whale Watch Kaikōura was registered as a limited liability company. As of 2026, the company is owned 56% by the Tukete Charitable Trust and 44% by Ngāi Tahu Capital Limited.

In 2002, the managing director of Whale Watch, Wally Stone was appointed as the chairman of the New Zealand Tourism Board, for a term of three years. In the Queen's Birthday Honours 2004, Stone was awarded the New Zealand Order of Merit. He was re-appointed for a further term as Chairman of the Tourism Board in 2005. Stone was inducted into the New Zealand Business Hall of Fame in 2023.

In 2002, the whale-watching business was described as the main attraction in Kaikōura, with the town receiving around 1 million visitors each year. In December 2002, the Whale Watch fleet was expanded with a further 18 m (59 ft) catamaran vessel built by QWest Boat Builders in Whanganui. By 2003, the business had grown by 43% over three years, and was operating four catamaran vessels, with a combined passenger capacity of 192 people. The company reported that 85% of their customers were international visitors, with most of those coming from the Northern Hemisphere. By 2004, there were 80,000 customers per annum. The expansion of the fleet required the construction of a new marina at South Bay.

By 2009, the company was taking between 90,000 and 100,000 people a year on whale-watching trips, and the business was the largest employer in Kaikōura with over 70 staff during the peak season. In 2012, Whale Watch was operating four vessels, each making four trips a day, with each trip up to 3 hours in duration, depending on demand and sea conditions.

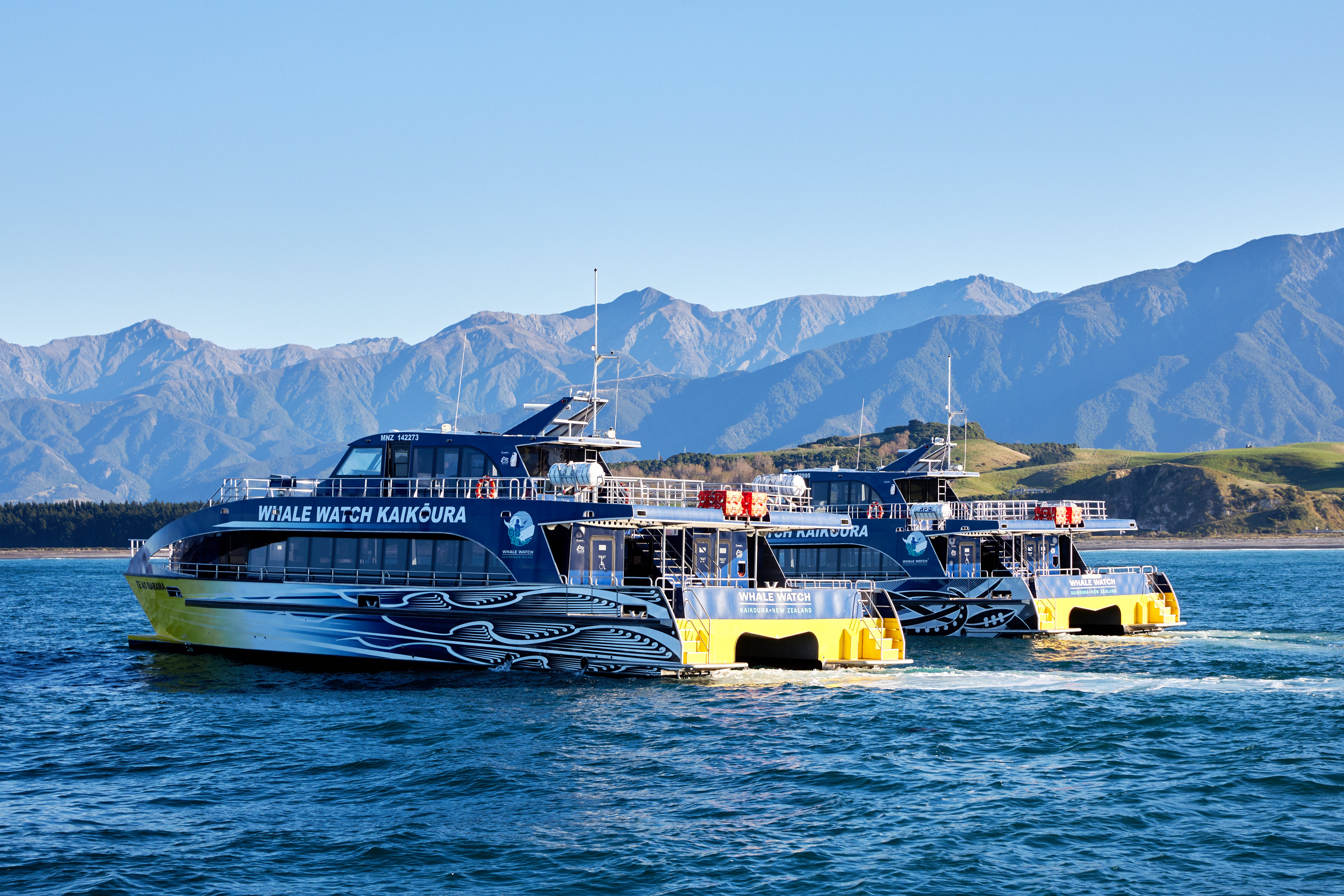
New Whale Watch Kaikōura boats, April 2022

The Kaikōura earthquake on 14 November 2016 lifted the seabed around the coastline. At the marina at South Bay, the seabed lifted by more than one metre, leading to vessels resting on rock at low tide. Whale Watch Kaikōura suspended its operations. By 31 December 2016, Whale Watch had trialled a modified trailer that could launch its vessel Tohora in the marina, and began whale-watching trips again, operating one tour each day with only one boat, and limited to periods around high tide. Whale Watch reported that they were operating at only 20 per cent of their capability, and that there had been a 60 per cent fall in visitor numbers. The Hurunui/Kaikōura Earthquakes Emergency Relief Act 2016 provided a modified resource consent process that enabled a shortened process for consenting works needed to restore the harbour. Excavation work in the harbour began in late December with government funding of $5 million and a subsequent contribution of $1 million from the Kaikōura District Council, Whale Watch and Encounter Kaikōura. The excavation and reconstruction of the harbour was originally expected to take a year, but was completed in nine months, with an official re-opening on 14 November 2017.

In July 2025, a television documentary The Bones of our Past was released, narrated by the people of Ngāti Kuri. The initial focus of the documentary was the art in the wharenui of the Takahanga Marae, but the scope expanded to include the story behind the founding of the marae, the formation of the Whale Watch enterprise and the cultural revival of Ngāti Kuri.

== Conservation and regulation ==
In 1989, the Department of Conservation expressed concern over the number of vessels involved in whale watching off the Kaikōura coast. They indicated that a limit would be needed on the number of commercial whale-watching permits issued under the Marine Mammals Protection Act 1978. In 1990, two companies Kaikoura Tours and Nature Watch Charters held permits for commercial whale watching from a vessel, but there were a further 9 applications from charter vessel operators waiting for the issue of a permit.

The Marine Mammals Protection Regulations 1990 provided a framework for the Director-General of Conservation to issue permits for commercial operators to approach marine mammals for viewing in New Zealand waters. The regulations set limits for whale watching of 50 m (160 ft) for the closest permitted approach by a vessel, and restricted the speed of a vessel within 300 m (980 ft) of a whale. Additional restrictions were provided if there were already three vessels in close proximity to a whale or if the whale was a female with a calf. The regulations governing whale watching were expanded with the issue of the Marine Mammals Protection Regulations 1992.

In 1991, the Department of Conservation reported that whale-watching activities were causing distress to whales and altering their behaviour. A researcher recommended that whale-watching operators should use larger and slower-moving vessels. In early 1992, Kaikoura Tours introduced new larger vessels with a capacity of 30 passengers to meet increasing demand. By September 1993, the company was operating four vessels, each making several trips a day, with a new vessel able to carry 60 passengers about to be delivered. In December 1993, the Department of Conservation amended permits for whale watching to allow the use of larger vessels.

In October 1994, the Worldwide Fund for Nature urged that no further permits should be issued for whale watching at Kaikōura because of the small number of whales that were the focus of most whale-watching activities.

In 1998, the Department of Conservation announced a 3 year moratorium on the issue of new permits for whale watching, pending the outcomes of research. At the time, the permits held by Whale Watch allowed for four trips a day for each of four vessels. In March 2002, the Department of Conservation released results of a study on whale behaviour, indicating concern that whale watching was affecting the behaviour of the animals, and there should be no increase in the number of commercial whale watch trips.

As of 2026, Whale Watch Kaikōura is the only ecotourism operator with permits for commercial whale watching from a vessel off Kaikōura, and has been the only permit holder since 1990.

== The Whales Case (1995) ==
A case involving Whale Watch Kaikōura was heard in the New Zealand Court of Appeal in 1995. Litigation began in November 1992 when Ngāi Tahu lodged an objection to the Director-General of Conservation issuing further permits for commercial whale watching at Kaikōura. The objection was based on the Treaty of Waitangi and legitimate expectation. The Department of Conservation put a hold on issuing new permits in February 1993. Ngāi Tahu obtained an injunction in March 1993, restraining the Department of Conservation from issuing new permits, pending a full hearing of the Ngai Tahu claim for exclusive rights. The case was heard in the High Court in December 1994. The High Court ruled against the Ngai Tahu claim for exclusive rights, but Ngai Tahu appealed and the case was heard in the Court of Appeal in May 1995. The litigation led to a hold on the issue of new permits for whale watching from aircraft as well as from vessels.

The decision of the Court of Appeal was released in September 1995. It found that Ngāi Tahu could not claim a right of veto over competing proposals for commercial whale watching. However, the Court also found that a reasonable Treaty partner should recognise that the principles of the Treaty of Waitangi are relevant and should be given broad consideration in this case, to recognise the special interests that Ngāi Tahu have in the coastal waters. The decision provided guidance to the Department of Conservation that after considering the main conservation issues, decisions about whale-watching permits should take into account the protection of Ngāi Tahu interests under the Treaty. The decision has been referenced as "The Whales Case" in other litigation involving the principles of the Treaty of Waitangi.

== Awards and recognition ==
The company has received multiple national and international awards:

Year	Award	References
1990	New Zealand Tourist Industry Federation Award	
1994	British Airways Tourism for Tomorrow Award	
1995	Kaikoura Tourism Award	
1997	Green Globe Achievement Award with Distinction	
1997	Pacific Asia Travel Association Gold Award in Culture & Heritage Category	
2001	Tourism Industry Association – New Zealand Tourism Operator of the Decade	
2003	Champion Canterbury Awards – Champion Host Med/Large Enterprise	
2003	Australian Effects and Animation Festival Awards – Education & Training	
2009	Best In a Marine Environment – Virgin Holidays Responsible Tourism Awards	
2009	Supreme Winner – Virgin Holidays Responsible Tourism Awards	
2010	Champion Canterbury Award – Champion Host Med/Large Enterprise	
2010	Champion Canterbury Awards – Supreme Winner Med/Large Enterprise	
2010	World Travel & Tourism Council, Tourism for Tomorrow Community Benefit Award	
2011	Pacific Asia Travel Association Gold Award in Environment & Eco-Tourism Category	
2014	Australasian Responsible Tourism Award – Asia & Australasia World Travel Awards	
2016	Communicator Award of Excellence – Websites – Travel/Tourism	
2017	Australasian Responsible Tourism Award – Asia & Australasia World Travel Awards	
2017	Maritime & Shipping: Most Sustainable Eco-Tourism Company – New Zealand	
2018	Tourism Industry Aotearoa – He Kai Kei Aku Ringa Māori Tourism Award	
2018	Maritime & Shipping: Best Marine Eco-Tourism Activity – New Zealand	
2019	Matariki Awards: Te Tapu-ā-Nuku Award for Business & Innovation and the supreme award: Te Tohu Tiketike o Matariki	

== Incidents ==
- In February 1991, the company bus was destroyed by arson, while it was parked outside the headquarters. This incident followed interference with the outboard motors of their vessel in late 1990.
- In June 1992, a vessel skipper working for Kaikoura Tours was reprimanded by the Department of Conservation for exceeding speed restrictions close to whales, and approaching closer than the permitted 50 m (160 ft) minimum distance.
- On 2 March 1996, a rigid inflatable vessel Uruao operated by Whale Watch suffered a major failure leading to a capsize. One passenger was trapped beneath the capsized vessel and drowned.
- In December 2023, an employee of Whale Watch suffered injuries after falling through an open hatch on a company vessel. In March 2024, another employee was injured in a fall between gangway and a company vessel while it was docked. In April 2025, the company pleaded guilty to charges under health and safety legislation and in a subsequent hearing was fined $246,500.
