= Mount Fyffe =

Mountain in New Zealand

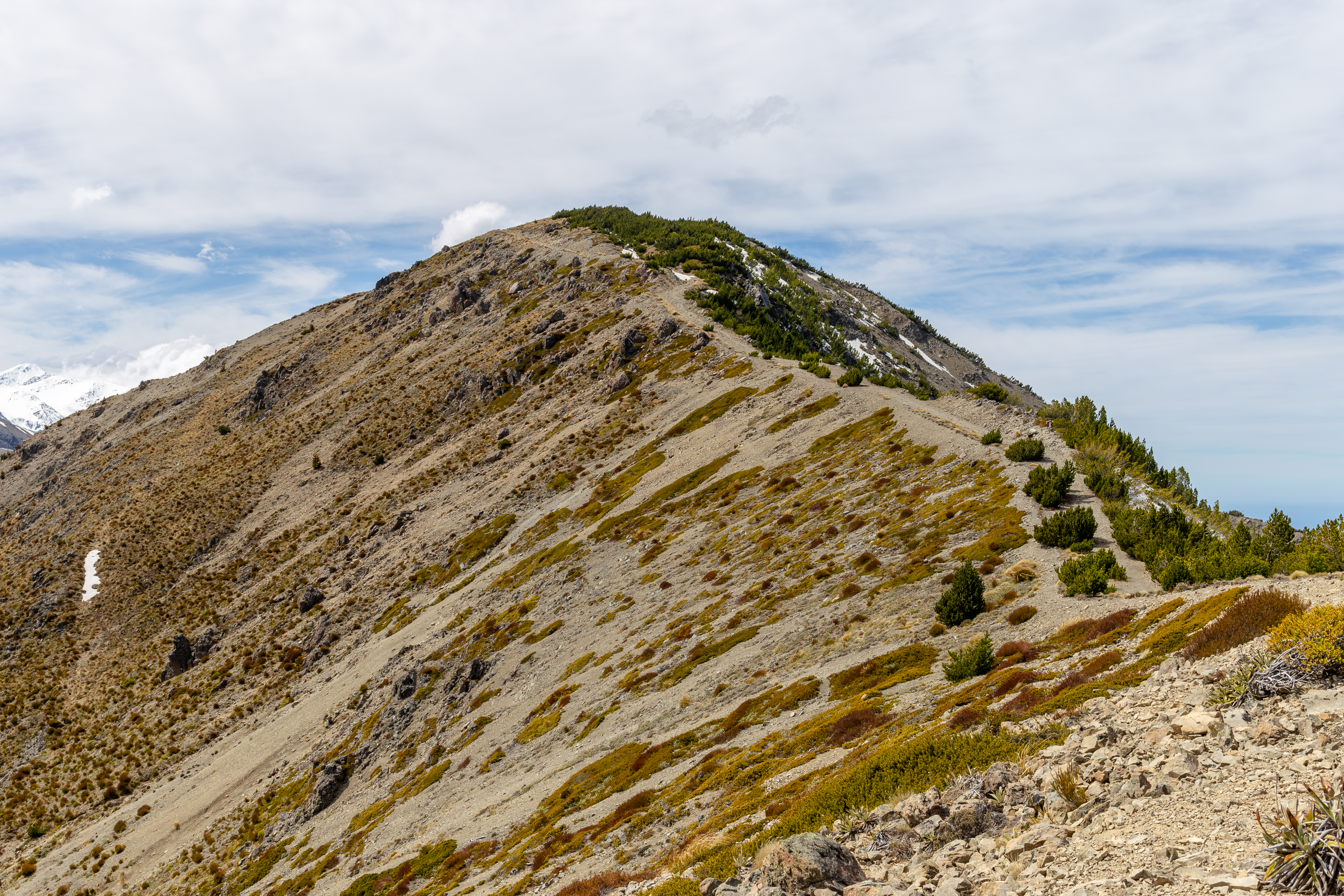
- Ridge leading to the top of Mount Fyffe

Highest point
- Elevation: 1,602 m (5,256 ft)
- Prominence: 1,602 m (5,256 ft)
- Coordinates: 42°18′37.59″S 173°36′44.73″E

Geography
- Location within New Zealand
- Location: South Island, New Zealand
- Parent range: Seaward Kaikōura Range

Mount Fyffe is a mountain peak in the Seaward Kaikōura Range, in the Canterbury region of New Zealand's South Island. The mountain was named after Robert Fyffe, a whaler who introduced sheep and milking goats to Kaikōura.

== Location ==
The summit is around 11 km from Kaikōura. On a clear day, it provides views of the Banks Peninsula to the south and the North Island to the north.

About 2 km from the top, there is a backcountry shelter Mt Fyffe Hut. This 8-bunk hut is managed by the Department of Conservation.

== Access ==
A rough 4WD track goes all the way to the top of Mount Fyffe. This track can be used both by hikers and mountain bikers.

== Gallery ==
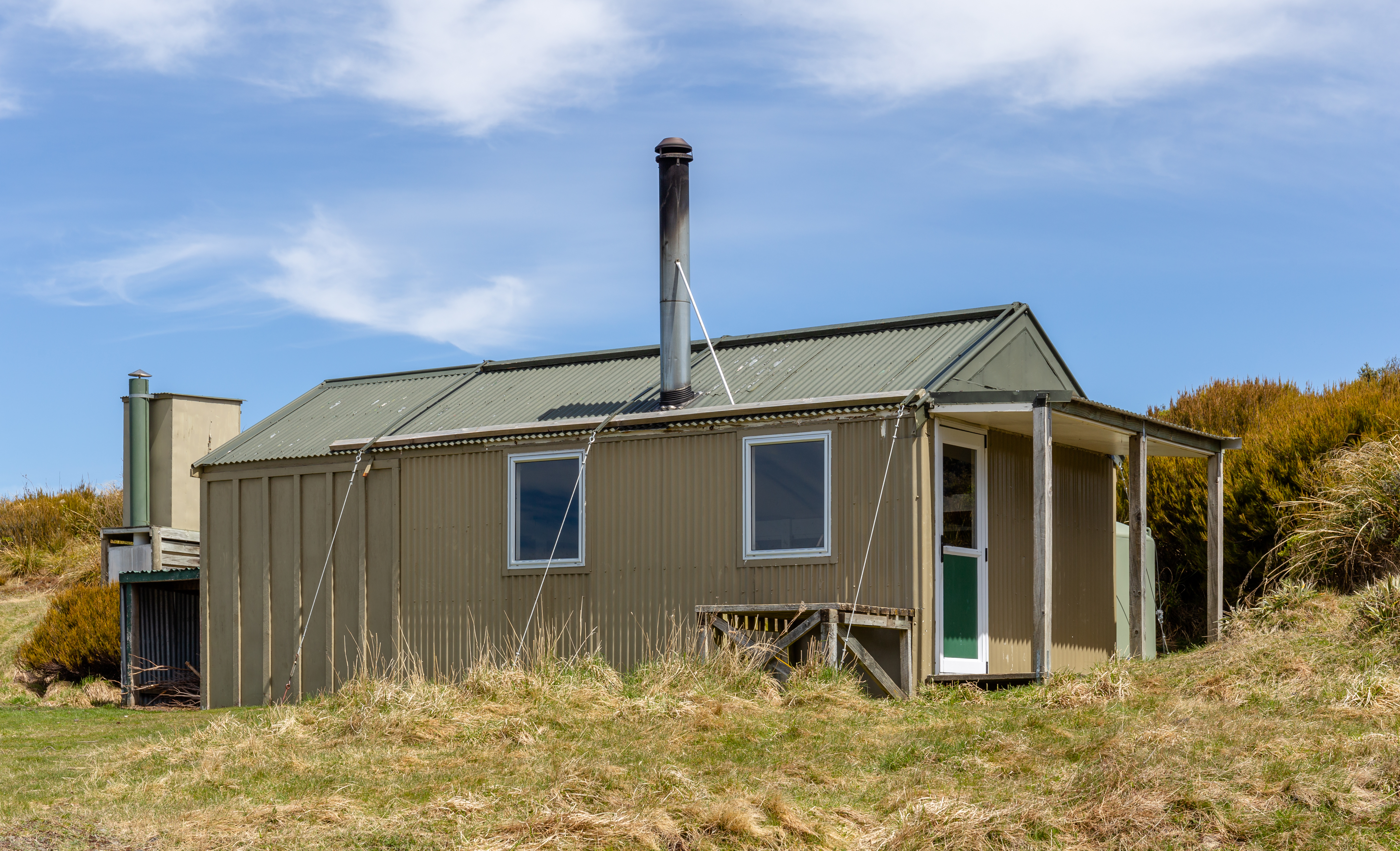
Mt Fyffe Hut

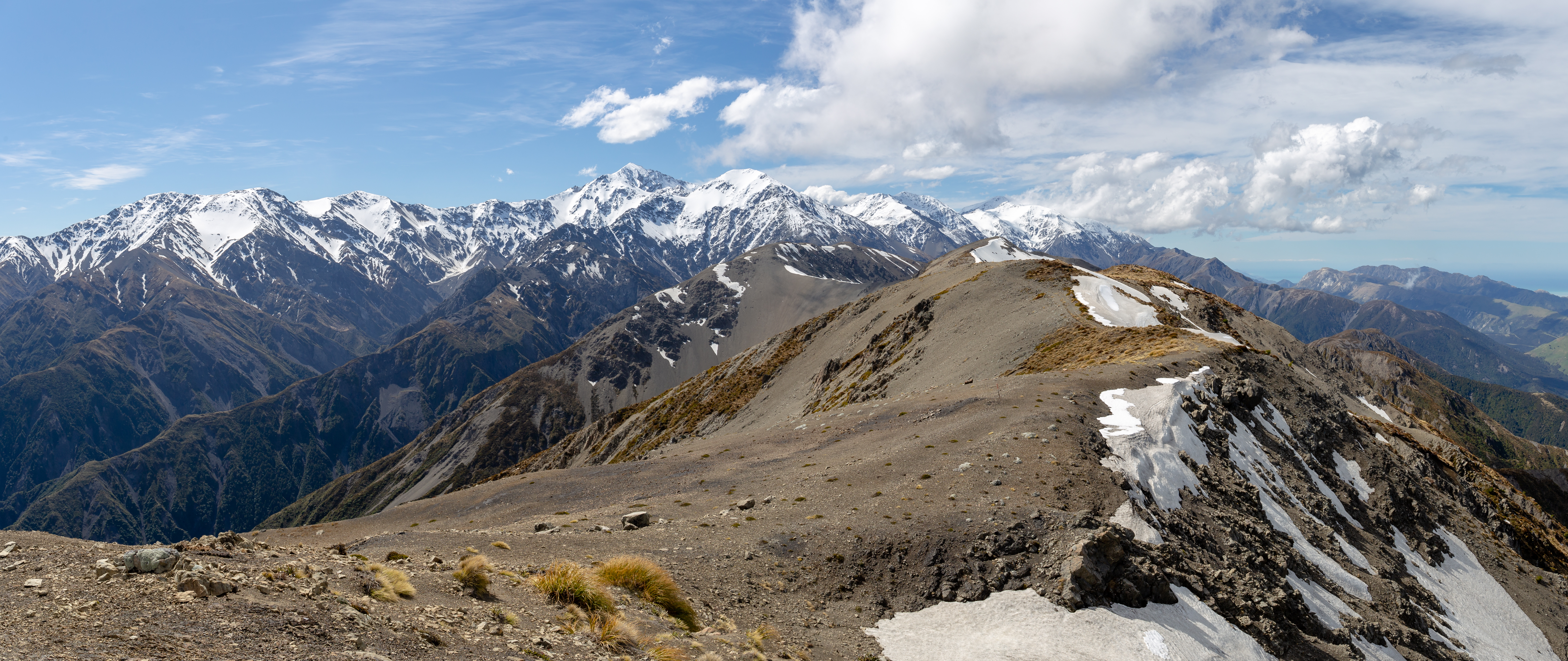
View from Mt Fyffe towards Manakau

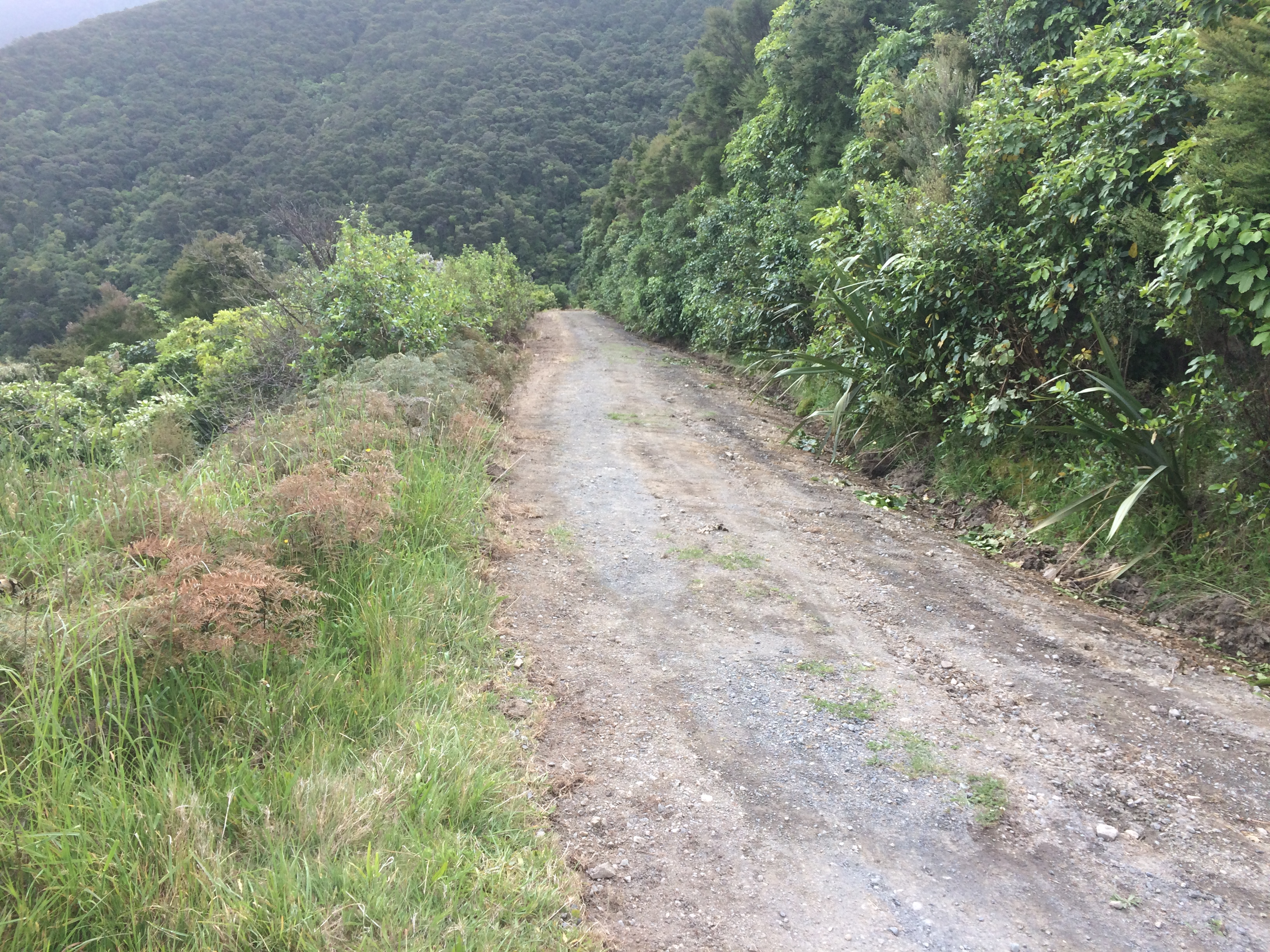
Track up Mount Fyffe

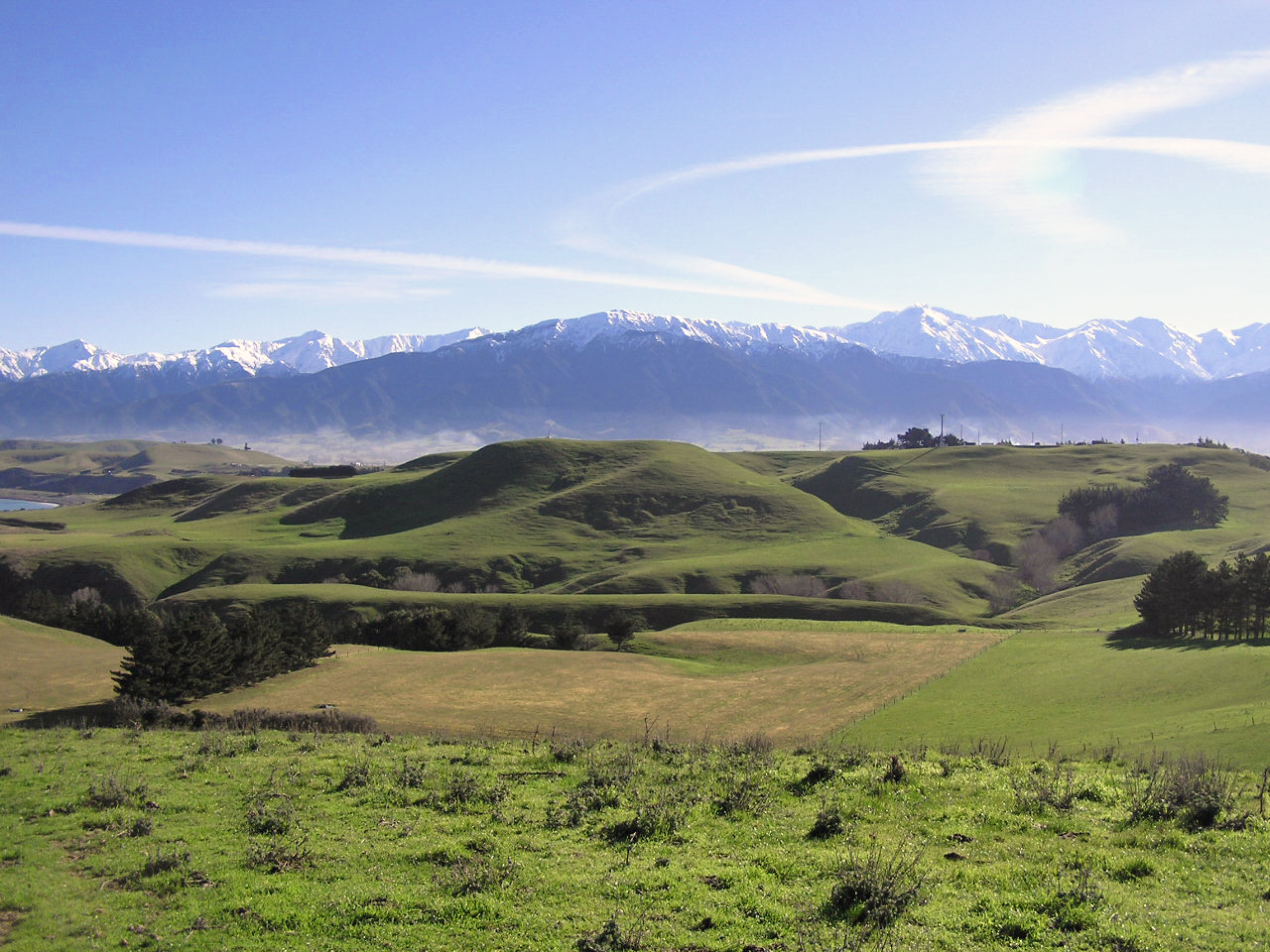
Kaikōura Peninsula and Mt Fyffe
