= Kaikōura =

Town in the South Island of New Zealand

- Minor urban area
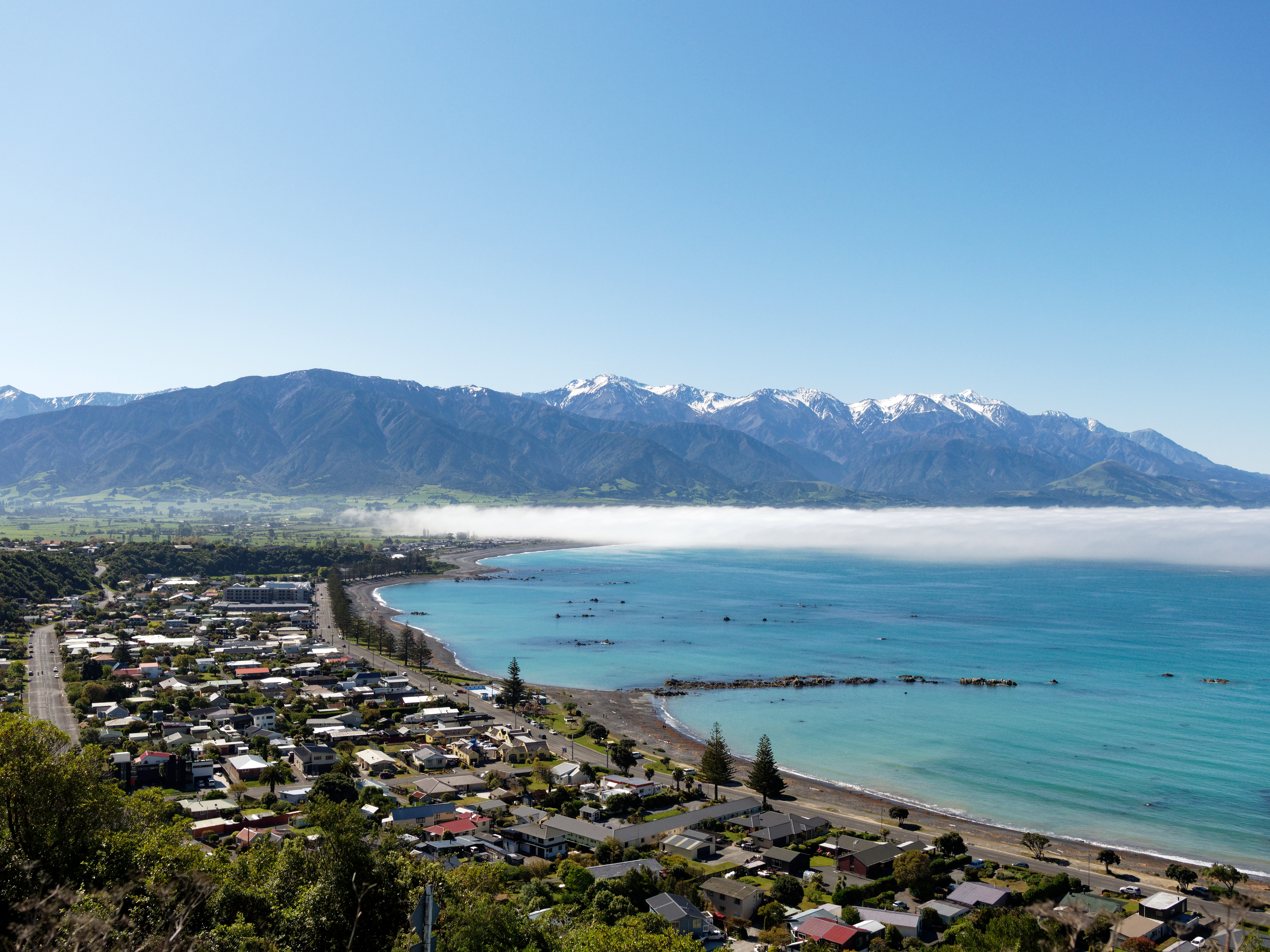
- Town of Kaikōura as seen from the peninsula
- Interactive map of Kaikōura
- Coordinates: 42.40°S 173.68°E
- Country: New Zealand
- Region: Canterbury
- Territorial authority: Kaikōura District
- Electorates: Kaikōura; Te Tai Tonga (Māori)

Government
  - Territorial Authority: Kaikōura District Council
  - Kaikōura District Mayor: Craig Mackle
  - Kaikōura MP: Stuart Smith
  - Te Tai Tonga MP: Mananui Ramsden

Area
  - Urban: 9.28 km^{2} (3.58 sq mi)
  - District: 2,046.81 km^{2} (790.28 sq mi)

Population (June 2025)
  - Urban: 2,350
  - Urban density: 253/km^{2} (656/sq mi)
  - District: 4,340
  - District density: 2.12/km^{2} (5.49/sq mi)
- District Postcode(s): Map of postcodes
- City Postcode: 7300
- Website: www.kaikoura.co.nz

Kaikōura (/kaɪˈkɔːrə/; Māori pronunciation: [kaiˈkoːuɾa]) is a town on the east coast of the South Island of New Zealand, located on State Highway 1, 180 kilometres (110 mi) north of Christchurch. The town has an estimated permanent resident population of 2,350 as of June 2025. Kaikōura is the seat of the territorial authority of the Kaikōura District, which is part of the Canterbury region. In 2023, Kaikōura was named as one of the "most beautiful small towns in the world".

Kaikōura was first inhabited by the Māori, with the Ngāi Tahu iwi occupying the area since at least 1670. Europeans began to settle in Kaikōura in the mid-1840s. By the 1850s, land that had been acquired was sold to European settlers, who most often started sheep farms in the area. Mount Fyffe in the Seaward Kaikōura Range is named in honour of Robert Fyffe and his family, the first European settlers in the area.

The present town owes its origin to the richness of marine life in the ocean, since it developed as a centre for the whaling industry. The name Kaikōura means 'meal of crayfish' (kai – food/meal, kōura – crayfish) and the crayfish industry still plays a role in the economy of the region. Kaikōura is known for its biodiversity – a wide variety of marine mammals can be seen in the sea, including seals, whales and dolphins. It has also been described as "one of the best places in the world to see seabirds", with an exceptional diversity of albatross species. The town has now become a popular tourist destination, mainly for whale watching and swimming with dolphins. Kaikōura receives around 1 million visitors a year. Major ecotourism operators based in the town include Whale Watch Kaikōura and Encounter Kaikōura.

The infrastructure of Kaikōura was heavily damaged in the 2016 Kaikōura earthquake, with one of the two earthquake fatalities happening near the town. The bay and surrounding region were uplifted by as much as 2 metres (6 ft 7 in).

== History ==
=== Early Māori history ===
In Māori mythology, Kaikōura Peninsula (Te Taumanu-o-te-waka-a-Māui) was the seat where Māui sat when he fished the North Island (Te Ika-a-Māui) up from the depths of the sea.

Māori have long been resident in Kaikōura, and archaeological evidence of moa bones indicates that they hunted moa there. In the late 1850s, during excavations for the construction of a building near the whaling station on the north side of the Kaikōura Peninsula, an ancient Māori burial site was found containing the egg of a South Island giant moa. The egg is 240 mm x 178 mm and is the largest known moa egg. It is held in the collections of Te Papa. After moa numbers declined, Kaikōura was still an attractive place to live because of its abundance of seafood. The Ngāi Tahu iwi have been resident in the Kaikōura area since at least 1670. Numerous pā sites are located around Kaikōura. The numbers identified vary between 14 and 40.

Captain James Cook saw Kaikōura in 1770 but did not land there. He reported seeing four double-hulled canoes containing 57 Māori approaching HMS Endeavour.

In 1827–1828, Kaikōura was the site of the battle of Niho Maaka, between musket-armed Ngāti Toa (led by Te Rauparaha) and the Kāti Kurī people of Ngāi Tahu. Several hundred Ngāi Tahu were killed or captured. Ngāi Tahu were surprised by the Ngāti Toa raiding party, as they were expecting a visit from the Ngāti Kahungunu sub-tribe Tū-te-pākihi-rangi, with whom they were friends. Only those Kāti Kurī who fled to the hills survived. The name of the battle comes from a threat made by Rerewaka, one of the Kaikōura chiefs, who said he would slit Te Rauparaha's belly with a shark tooth (niho maaka) if he came south.

=== Whaling stations ===
The Fyffe family was the first European family to settle in Kaikōura, when Robert Fyffe established a whaling station at Kaikōura in 1842. John Guard and his family joined Fyffe sometime between 1844 and 1846. 40 men were employed at the whaling station initially. In 1845, Fyffe purchased a second whaling station at South Bay, which was known as Fyffe's Village and became the commercial centre of Kaikōura until 1867. Fyffe diversified into shipping and farming after whale numbers declined. Robert Fyffe died in 1854 and his cousin George Fyffe took over the whaling business and lived at Fyffe House. The Marlborough Express newspaper commented in 1866 that "whales seemed to have abandoned coming to Kaikōura", but the whaling stations continued operating until 1922.

Mount Fyffe owes its name to the Fyffe family. Fyffe House, the cottage built in 1842 that was home to the Fyffe family, still stands. The area surrounding the house, including Avoca Point, has been listed as a Historic Area by Heritage New Zealand. The construction of the cottage is unusual in that the supporting foundations of the house are made of whalebone.

=== European settlement ===
The New Zealand government purchased land north of Kaikōura from Ngāti Toa in 1847. This was challenged by Ngāi Tahu, who said that Ngāti Toa had no right to sell land that did not belong to them. In 1857, the New Zealand government made an offer for land between the Ashley and Waiau Uwha rivers for 200 pounds, which was signed by Ngāi Tahu. Other land deals were completed in the area, leaving small reserves for local Māori. These reserves were reduced after 1900 when the government compulsorily acquired further land for the proposed railway and "scenic purposes".

From the 1850s, land that had been acquired was sold to European settlers who most often started sheep farms in the area. Many small blocks were sold around the Kaikōura Peninsula roads and bridges were built in the 1870s. A small wharf was completed in 1863. The Inland Kaikōura Road to Rotherham was completed by 1888. The road that became State Highway 1 was started in the 1890s across the Hundalee Hills with bridges across the rivers completed in 1914. Fifty-nine Norfolk pines were planted along the Esplanade between 1900 and the 1930s. These trees now have "protected trees" status from the Kaikōura District Council.

=== 20th century ===
The population increased as a result of the extensive works required to build the railway in 1935. In December 1945, the Christchurch to Picton railway line was officially opened at Kaikōura. 5,000 people came out to celebrate the occasion. The population fell slightly after the railway was completed. In 1962 the roll-on/roll-off car ferry between Wellington and Picton increased travel between the North and South Islands, bringing more visitors to Kaikōura. There was only one motel (with 40 beds) before 1962.

Between 1945 and 1960, over-fishing led to a decline in the numbers of crayfish (spiny lobsters). By 1975, the decline in crayfish numbers had extended to other fish species. In 1975, 97 registered fishing vessels were operating out of Kaikōura. There are reports that between 1963 and 1964, 248 sperm whales in Kaikoura waters were killed during the last of the whaling activity in New Zealand.

Kaikōura struggled economically during the 1970s. In 1975, there were 304 motel beds and a further 500 campground beds and hotel beds. The Marlborough Regional Development Council noted that there was investment in accommodation but not in tourist attractions at this time. The restructuring of the economy following the election of the Labour government in 1984 also affected Kaikōura adversely. Farm incomes dropped and public sector employment was badly affected. 170 jobs were lost in a town of 3,000.

In 1985, a group of local Kaikōura people established a tourist centre and began promoting Kaikōura as a tourist destination. The focus at that stage was on walking opportunities and the scenery. Whale-watching was established as a tourist venture in Kaikōura in 1987. Local Māori leaders were concerned about unemployment in the town and mortgaged their houses to buy a 6.7 metres (22 ft) boat to start up a whale watching business to see the local sperm whales. In the first year of operation, 3,000 tourists took the opportunity to see whales. The business subsequently became Whale Watch Kaikōura and visitor numbers greatly expanded to more than 100,000 per annum.

The town was severely affected when the Kowhai River burst its banks on 23 December 1993, flooding the main street to a depth of 1 m (3 ft 3 in). A civil defence emergency was declared, and over 60 residents were evacuated. Many homes, businesses and school buildings suffered flood damage.

=== 2016 Kaikōura earthquake ===
On 14 November 2016, a 7.8-magnitude earthquake struck the South Island just after midnight. It left two people dead (one near the town and one in the adjacent Hurunui District) and triggered a small tsunami. One thousand tourists and hundreds of residents were stranded in Kaikōura after the earthquake cut off all road and railway access. New Zealand Air Force helicopters flew many people out of Kaikōura and the New Zealand Navy sent HMNZS Canterbury to ferry many hundreds of tourists out.

The Main North Line (Picton to Christchurch railway, passing through Kaikōura) was badly damaged, reopening to freight traffic only on 15 September 2017. The Coastal Pacific passenger service resumed once all repairs were completed in mid-2018. 1700 construction workers completed two million man-hours to repair the quake-damaged sections of State Highway 1, and it reopened on 15 December 2017. The repairs included fixing almost 200 kilometres (120 mi) of damaged road and a similar length of railway line. The total cost was around NZ$1.1 billion.

== Geography ==
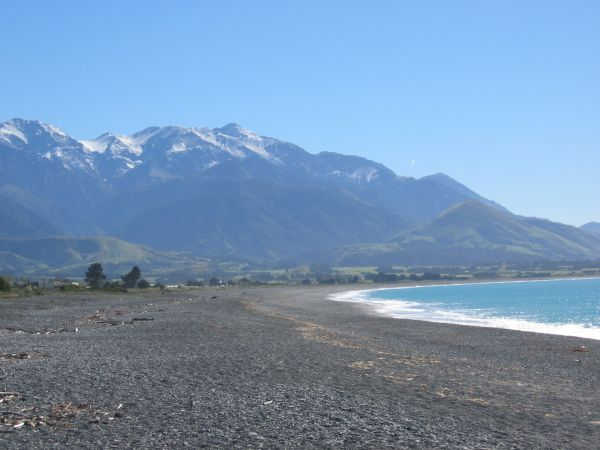
The Kaikōura Ranges viewed from a beach

The coastline stretching roughly between the mouths of the Conway and Waiau Toa / Clarence Rivers is generally known as the Kaikōura coast. This coastline is unusual for the east coast of the South Island, as there is very little coastal plain, with the Seaward Kaikōura Range, a branch of the Southern Alps, rising straight from the ocean. The Kaikōura Peninsula extends into the sea south of the town and the Seaward Kaikōuras are a backdrop to the north and west.

The Kaikōura Canyon is a geologically active submarine canyon located southwest of the Kaikōura Peninsula. The canyon descends into deep water and merges into an ocean channel system that can be traced for hundreds of kilometres across the deep ocean floor. At the head of the canyon, the depth of water is around 30 metres (98 ft), but it drops rapidly to 600 metres (2,000 ft) and continues down to around 2,000 metres (6,600 ft) deep where it meets the Hikurangi Channel. Sperm whales come close to the coast because the deep water of the Kaikōura Canyon is only one kilometre (0.62 mi) off the shoreline to the south of the Kaikoura Peninsula. Studies of the Kaikōura Canyon have found that it is a highly productive ecosystem with 10 to 100 times the density of marine life found in other deep sea habitats.

=== Climate ===
Climate data for Kaikōura (1991–2020 normals, extremes 1963–present)
Month	Jan	Feb	Mar	Apr	May	Jun	Jul	Aug	Sep	Oct	Nov	Dec	Year
Record high °C (°F)	33.3 (91.9)	34.3 (93.7)	32.6 (90.7)	28.8 (83.8)	25.8 (78.4)	24.8 (76.6)	22.3 (72.1)	23.5 (74.3)	25.5 (77.9)	31.8 (89.2)	32.8 (91.0)	33.2 (91.8)	34.3 (93.7)
Mean daily maximum °C (°F)	20.3 (68.5)	20.2 (68.4)	18.7 (65.7)	16.2 (61.2)	14.5 (58.1)	12.1 (53.8)	11.2 (52.2)	11.9 (53.4)	13.8 (56.8)	15.5 (59.9)	17.0 (62.6)	19.1 (66.4)	15.9 (60.6)
Daily mean °C (°F)	16.6 (61.9)	16.7 (62.1)	15.3 (59.5)	13.1 (55.6)	11.4 (52.5)	9.2 (48.6)	8.4 (47.1)	9.0 (48.2)	10.5 (50.9)	11.9 (53.4)	13.4 (56.1)	15.4 (59.7)	12.6 (54.6)
Mean daily minimum °C (°F)	12.9 (55.2)	13.1 (55.6)	11.9 (53.4)	10.0 (50.0)	8.3 (46.9)	6.3 (43.3)	5.6 (42.1)	6.0 (42.8)	7.1 (44.8)	8.2 (46.8)	9.7 (49.5)	11.7 (53.1)	9.2 (48.6)
Record low °C (°F)	5.0 (41.0)	5.5 (41.9)	3.5 (38.3)	2.2 (36.0)	1.1 (34.0)	−0.6 (30.9)	−0.6 (30.9)	−1.0 (30.2)	0.5 (32.9)	−0.2 (31.6)	2.0 (35.6)	3.9 (39.0)	−1.0 (30.2)
Average rainfall mm (inches)	47.4 (1.87)	39.3 (1.55)	66.1 (2.60)	66.6 (2.62)	51.0 (2.01)	73.0 (2.87)	86.5 (3.41)	59.1 (2.33)	53.6 (2.11)	64.4 (2.54)	58.8 (2.31)	49.3 (1.94)	715.1 (28.16)
Average rainy days (≥ 1.0 mm)	6.6	5.7	6.6	7.1	6.3	8.1	7.9	6.7	6.4	8.1	7.0	7.3	83.8
Average relative humidity (%)	76.1	77.9	76.3	74.9	71.7	71.0	70.9	71.1	69.5	73.2	72.7	75.6	73.4
Mean monthly sunshine hours	252.5	190.6	173.4	178.0	144.4	112.8	135.7	147.9	175.7	187.4	188.1	213.4	2,099.9
Source: NIWA Climate Data (sunshine 1981–2010)

Climate data for Middle Creek, Kaikōura (1991–2020)
Month	Jan	Feb	Mar	Apr	May	Jun	Jul	Aug	Sep	Oct	Nov	Dec	Year
Mean daily maximum °C (°F)	21.3 (70.3)	21.1 (70.0)	18.7 (65.7)	16.8 (62.2)	15.0 (59.0)	12.0 (53.6)	11.9 (53.4)	12.4 (54.3)	14.4 (57.9)	16.0 (60.8)	18.0 (64.4)	19.7 (67.5)	16.4 (61.6)
Daily mean °C (°F)	16.0 (60.8)	15.8 (60.4)	13.7 (56.7)	11.5 (52.7)	9.6 (49.3)	7.3 (45.1)	6.6 (43.9)	7.3 (45.1)	9.3 (48.7)	10.4 (50.7)	12.6 (54.7)	14.6 (58.3)	11.2 (52.2)
Mean daily minimum °C (°F)	10.7 (51.3)	10.5 (50.9)	8.7 (47.7)	6.2 (43.2)	4.2 (39.6)	2.7 (36.9)	1.3 (34.3)	2.1 (35.8)	4.1 (39.4)	4.9 (40.8)	7.1 (44.8)	9.5 (49.1)	6.0 (42.8)
Average rainfall mm (inches)	45.7 (1.80)	59.2 (2.33)	75.3 (2.96)	63.7 (2.51)	67.0 (2.64)	80.7 (3.18)	99.0 (3.90)	75.5 (2.97)	64.5 (2.54)	75.7 (2.98)	69.4 (2.73)	57.5 (2.26)	833.2 (32.8)
Source: NIWA (rainfall 1981–2010)

== Governance ==
The town is the seat of the territorial authority of the Kaikōura District, which is part of the Canterbury region. Local governance for Kaikōura is provided by the Kaikōura District Council. The council consists of a mayor and seven councillors. Elections for positions on the council are held every three years in conjunction with nationwide local elections. Kaikōura was the first local authority in the Southern Hemisphere to achieve recognition by the EarthCheck Community Standard.

For national elections, Kaikōura is part of the Kaikōura electorate. Stuart Smith of the National Party was elected in 2014 and as of 2026 still represents the electorate.

== Demographics ==
Kaikōura is described by Stats NZ as a small urban area, which covers 9.28 km^{2} (3.58 sq mi). It had an estimated population of 2,350 as of June 2025, with a population density of 253 people per km^{2}.

Historical population
Year	Pop.	±% p.a.
2006	2,202	—
2013	2,010	−1.29%
2018	2,223	+2.03%
2023	2,316	+0.82%

Kaikōura had a population of 2,316 in the 2023 New Zealand census, an increase of 93 people (4.2%) since the 2018 census, and an increase of 306 people (15.2%) since the 2013 census. There were 1,110 males, 1,206 females, and 3 people of other genders in 1,056 dwellings. 1.6% of people identified as LGBTIQ+. The median age was 53.5 years (compared with 38.1 years nationally). There were 333 people (14.4%) aged under 15 years, 276 (11.9%) aged 15 to 29, 960 (41.5%) aged 30 to 64, and 753 (32.5%) aged 65 or older.

People could identify as more than one ethnicity. The results were 85.5% European (Pākehā); 19.7% Māori; 1.3% Pasifika; 4.5% Asian; 0.9% Middle Eastern, Latin American and African New Zealanders (MELAA); and 2.8% other, which includes people giving their ethnicity as "New Zealander". English was spoken by 98.3%, Māori by 3.8%, Samoan by 0.1%, and other languages by 7.6%. No language could be spoken by 1.2% (e.g. too young to talk). New Zealand Sign Language was known by 0.5%. The percentage of people born overseas was 17.4, compared with 28.8% nationally.

Religious affiliations were 35.0% Christian, 0.4% Hindu, 0.4% Islam, 0.6% Māori religious beliefs, 0.5% Buddhist, 0.9% New Age, and 1.8% other religions. People who answered that they had no religion were 53.9%, and 7.3% of people did not answer the census question.

Of those at least 15 years old, 294 (14.8%) people had a bachelor's or higher degree, 1,056 (53.3%) had a post-high school certificate or diploma, and 627 (31.6%) people exclusively held high school qualifications. The median income was $33,100, compared with $41,500 nationally. 87 people (4.4%) earned over $100,000 compared to 12.1% nationally. The employment status of those at least 15 was 837 (42.2%) full-time, 300 (15.1%) part-time, and 24 (1.2%) unemployed.

== Economy ==
In 2025, the Kaikōura District Council was classified as the smallest territorial authority in New Zealand, based on a multi-criteria analysis.

Historically the economy of the district was based on primary industries including pastoral farming, dairy and fishing. Since the 1980s, the district has become a major tourism destination, with ecotourism attractions including whale watching, swimming with seals and dolphins, and albatross encounters, along with recreational opportunities including coastal walks, cycle trails, golf and surfing. There was a significant downturn in visitors caused by the 2016 earthquake, with the COVID-19 pandemic creating further impact in 2020–21. A $35 million 4.5-star hotel was due to open in September 2021, but work was delayed due to the loss of international tourists because of the COVID-19 pandemic. It was expected to provide economic stimulus to Kaikōura. The 120-room hotel opened in October 2022. By 2024, tourism and economic activity in the town had rebounded. As of 2024, the district receives around one million visitors each year,and tourism contributes almost 40% of the district GDP. The results of the 2018 Census showed that around a third of all properties in the district were unoccupied, suggesting that they are either holiday homes or held for short-term rentals as visitor accommodation.

In 2023-24, the GDP of the Kaikōura District was $190 million, with annual growth for the region of 3.3%. Tourism provided 27.6% of jobs in Kaikōura District in 2023, with accommodation and food services representing another 18.5%.

Ecotourism activities include tours provided by local operators who offer offshore experiences including whale and dolphin watching, swimming with dolphins, and seabird-watching tours based from the town and the local boat harbour. Commercial marine wildlife ecotour operations began around 1988. Major ecotourism operators include Whale Watch Kaikōura and Encounter Kaikōura. In addition to ecotourism, further tourism opportunities are under development including astrotourism, following accreditation of the Kaikōura District as an International Dark Sky Sanctuary, and cycle tourism, including construction of a long-distance cycle trail from Picton to Kaikōura known as the Whale Trail.

== Biodiversity ==
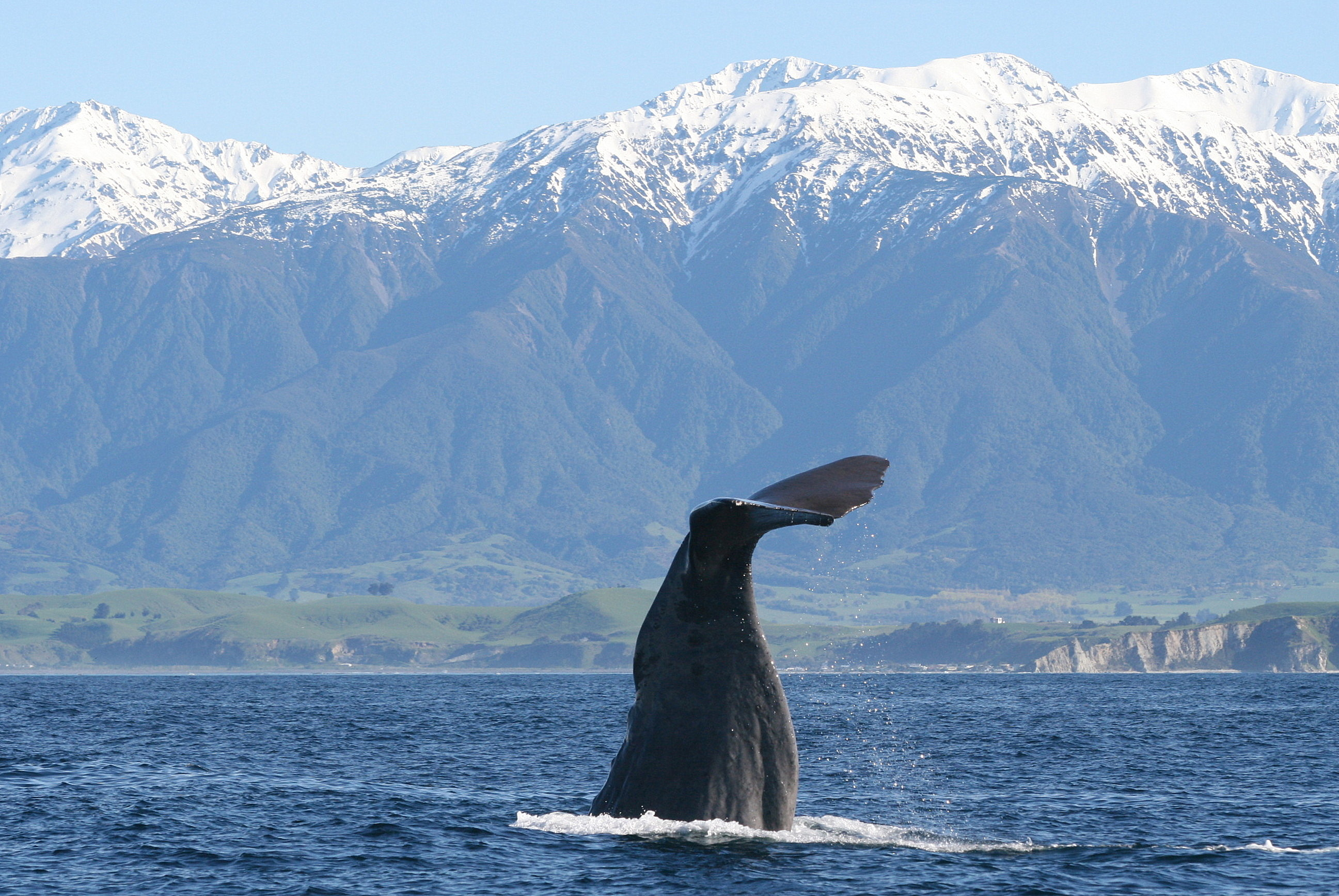
Diving sperm whale near the coast of Kaikōura

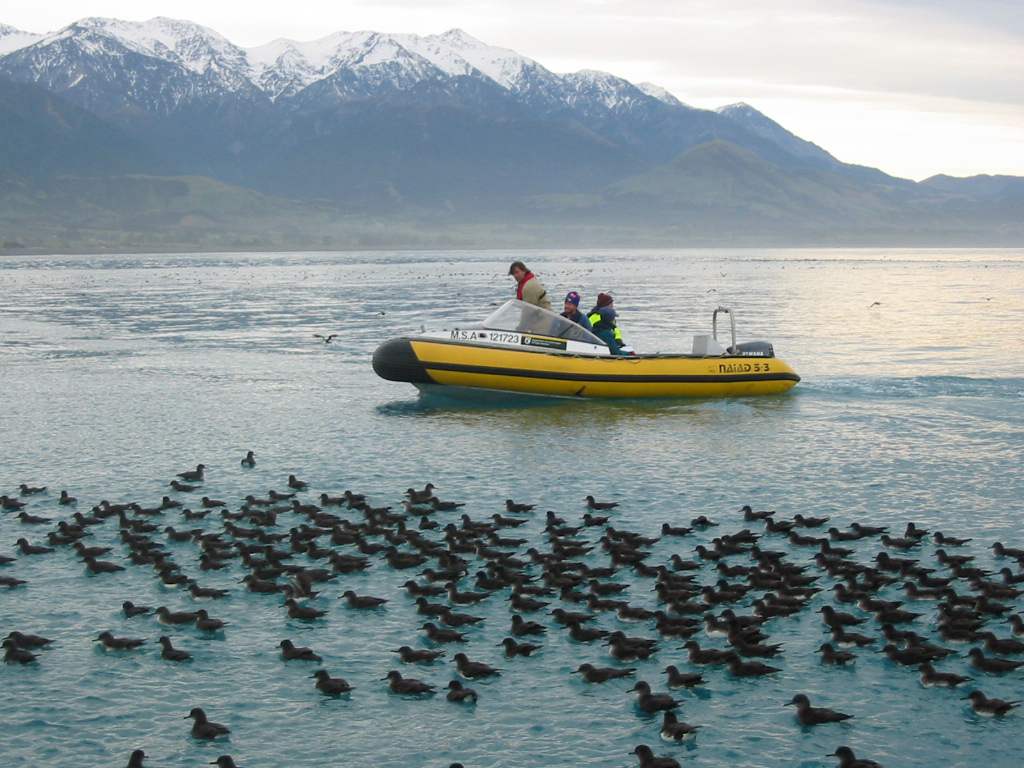
A raft of Hutton's shearwaters feeding off the Kaikōura coast

The Kaikōura region is known for its biodiversity. Its coastal waters are particularly rich in marine life, a result of the convergence of two ocean currents and the Kaikōura Canyon that creates deep water close inshore to the town. The ocean is fundamental to much of the biodiversity in the region. A wide variety of marine mammals can be seen near Kaikōura, including sperm whales (Physeter macrocephalus), dusky dolphins (Aethalodelphis obscurus), Hector's dolphin (Cephalorhynchus hectori), and New Zealand fur seals (Arctocephalus forsteri). New Zealand fur seals can be seen around the Kaikōura Peninsula adjacent to the town, and further north along the coast at Ōhau Point.

The waters off Kaikōura also support a wide variety of seabirds, and the region is designated as an Important Bird Area. Kaikōura has been described as "one of the best places in the world to see seabirds", with an exceptional diversity of albatross species.

The Hutton's shearwater (Puffinus huttoni) is an endangered seabird found in the Kaikōura region. It is the only seabird in the world that is known to breed in alpine areas, and its only two remaining breeding colonies are located in the Seaward Kaikōura Ranges above the town. In the breeding season, the birds fly into and out of their breeding colonies in the hours of darkness, passing close to the town. They can be disoriented by bright lights at night, leading to problems with adult and newly-fledged birds crash-landing in the streets of Kaikōura. Conservation measures for the bird include predator control at the breeding sites, establishing the Kaikōura Dark Sky Sanctuary, and community initiatives to rescue birds that crash-land at night.

There is a nationally significant breeding colony of endemic red-billed gulls on the Kaikōura Peninsula that can be seen from a coastal walkway. The banded dotterel (Anarhynchus bicinctus), known outside New Zealand as the double-banded plover, is a shorebird that nests on stony beaches around the Kaikōura Peninsula and South Bay. The species is listed as Nationally Vulnerable. Breeding success of banded dotterels at Kaikōura has been severely affected by predation from cats.

The little penguin (Eudyptula minor or kororā) is found along the Kaikōura coast. These birds are vulnerable to becoming entangled in fishing nets at sea, and to vehicle impact and predation by rats and domestic dogs while ashore. In a 2020 survey of 75 km (47 mi) of Kaikōura coastline, the only breeding colony located was in fragmented areas around the southern part of the Kaikōura Peninsula. In September 2026, Sabrina Luecht, a conservation advocate at Kaikōura and founder of Kaikōura Wildlife Rescue reported that the local kororā population was down to less than 50 birds, and was facing seasonal starvation as a result of depleted fish stocks and climate change. Luecht urged that the local colony of kororā should be vaccinated against the H5N1 virus that was expected to arrive in the region imminently, in a similar approach to that taken in Australia for 6,000 little penguins at St Kilda and Phillip Island. The proposal was rejected by the Department of Conservation and the Minister of Conservation, Tama Potaka. Luecht warned that mass mortality of the local penguin population was likely without vaccination.

== Dark Sky Sanctuary ==
An initiative was launched in 2022 to achieve international recognition of a dark-sky preserve in the Kaikōura area. The intention was to reduce the problems that lighting causes for Hutton's shearwaters. The Kaikōura District Council had already modified streetlighting, to reduce the risk to the birds. In April 2022, the Mayor of Kaikōura said that the dark-sky reserve initiative had the full support of the council, and would be a boost to tourist numbers, especially during the winter period. The Kaikōura Dark Sky Trust applied to DarkSky International for designation of an International Dark Sky Sanctuary in August 2024, and the designation was announced on 12 September 2024. The sanctuary covers an area of 2,039 km^{2} (787 sq mi), representing around 98% of the Kaikōura District, excluding the Kaikōura township. The Trust plans to apply for the Kaikōura township to be recognised with international dark sky community status.

== Amenities ==
=== Takahanga Marae ===
The tangata whenua of Kaikōura are Ngāi Tahu and their hapū (sub-tribe) Ngāti Kurī, who hold customary tribal authority over an area (rohe) that includes all of the Kaikōura District. Takahanga Marae is a marae (tribal meeting ground) of Ngāti Kurī and is the headquarters of Te Rūnanga o Kaikōura. The marae was built on a site that has been occupied for over 450 years, on a terrace overlooking Kaikōura. It was originally a pā site for Kāti Māmoe, and later occupied by Ngāti Kurī. The current marae was opened in 1992. The buildings include the wharenui (meeting house), named Maru Kaitatea after an ancestor. The wharenui contains carvings overseen by Cliff Whiting and artworks contributed by many Māori and Pākehā artists.

After the 2016 Kaikōura earthquake the marae became a critical welfare centre, providing food and emergency accommodation for people displaced in the earthquake. The marae served 10,000 meals in the week after the earthquake to anyone who needed them, including stranded tourists and emergency workers.

=== Kaikōura Civic Centre ===
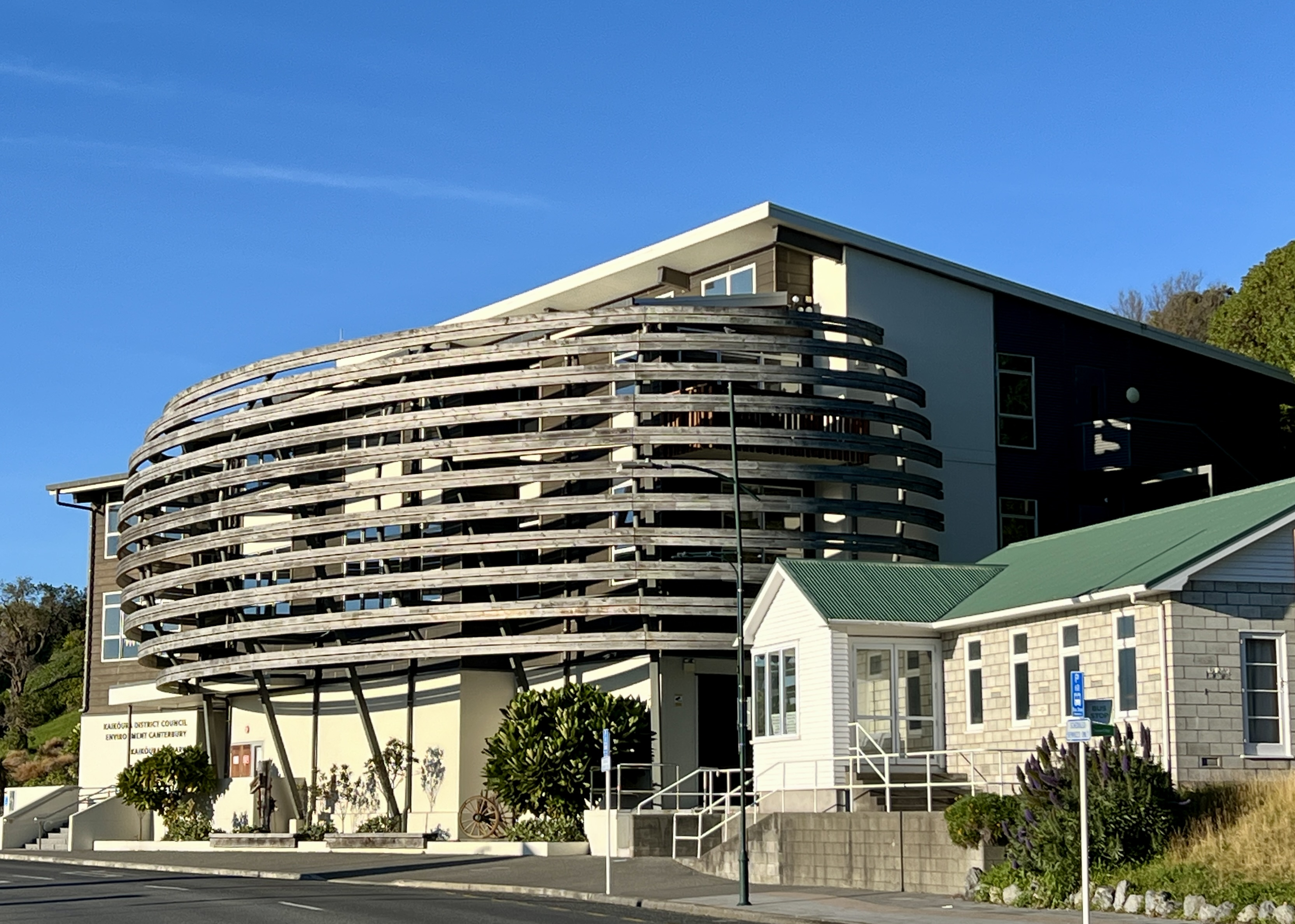
Kaikōura Civic Centre with the distinctive wooden cray pot (2025)

The Kaikōura Civic Centre was completed in 2016. It has a distinctive large 'cray pot' ( a circular trap for crayfish) on the outside of the building which represents Kaikōura's connection to the sea. It contains offices for the Kaikōura District Council, Kaikōura Library and Kaikōura Museum. A third floor was approved by the Kaikōura District Council in 2011, and the cost rose, which led to complaints from rate payers and submissions to the Long Term Plan in 2012 requesting restraint in spending. The long term financial situation for the Kaikōura District Council has been suggested to be tenuous.

=== Mayfair Theatre ===
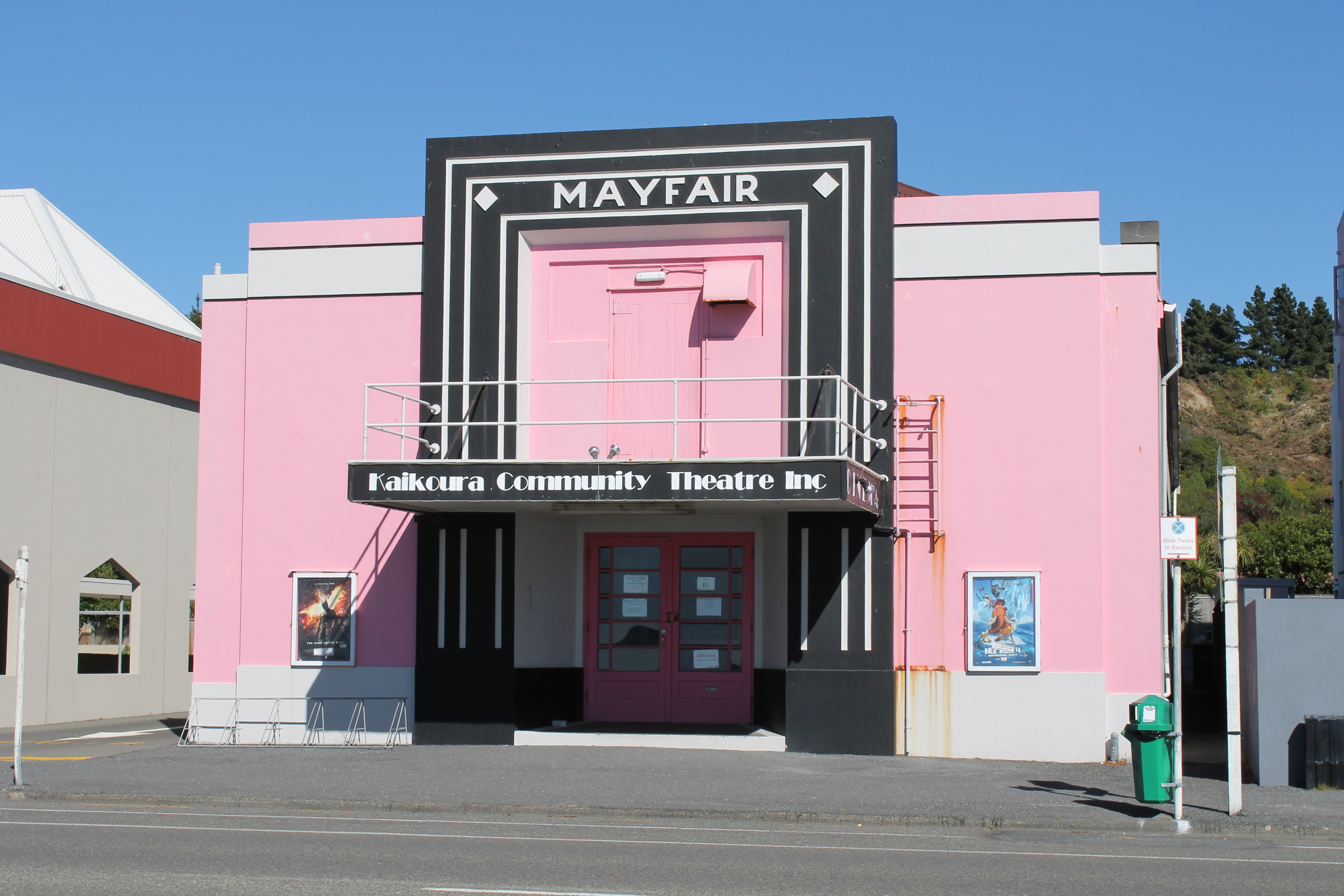
Mayfair Theatre, Kaikōura in 2012

The Mayfair Theatre was built in 1934 on the Esplanade in the art deco style as a venue for cinema and concerts. In 1970 the theatre was leased by Kaikoura High School and purchased for $13,000 by the community. In 1984 after the school lease ended it was run by the Kaikoura Community Theatre Inc. Trust.

The building was damaged beyond repair in the 2016 Kaikōura earthquake, but community fundraising efforts resulted in the construction of a new cinema and performance venue on the site, retaining the 1934 art deco façade. After a $3.6 million restoration project, the building was re-opened in November 2020 as the Mayfair Arts and Culture Centre Te Whare Toi ō Kaikōura. As well as two movie screens, it has an upstairs exhibition space.

=== Swimming pool ===
The Kaikōura swimming pool on the Esplanade was badly damaged in the 2016 earthquake, leaving Kaikōura without a public pool for five years. A charitable trust was established to raise funds to build a replacement pool. Funding of $3.7 million was raised for the build, with the Kaikōura District Council contributing $1 million, COVID Recovery Fund contributing $1 million and the Kaikōura Community Op Shop contributing $100,000. The Kaikōura Aquatic Centre opened in November 2021. It includes a 25 m x 12 m lap pool, a smaller pool for learners, and a toddler pool.

=== Horse racing ===
The Kaikōura race course is located on Bay Parade at South Bay and is administered by the Kaikōura Trotting Club. The club was established in 1914 with the first Kaikōura Trotting Cup won by a horse called Kintail owned by Albert Edgar and trained by Billie Honeybone. In 2021, the Kaikōura Trotting Cup weekend, normally held in early November, was transferred to Addington Raceway in Christchurch due to COVID-19 restrictions.

=== Golf courses ===
The Kaikōura golf club was established in 1911, with 39 members joining during the first season. The first nine-hole course was located at the South Bay Domain. In 1935, the course moved to a new nine-hole course with a clubhouse near the Kowhai River. In 1958, three extra holes were added, and in 1960, a further three holes were added. In 1963, the course was extended again to 18 holes. The Koura Bay golf resort, just to the north of Kaikōura, has a nine-hole golf course.

== Infrastructure ==
The rebuild after the 2016 earthquake replaced or upgraded many of Kaikōura District Council's assets. These included replacing the oldest water mains built in the 1920s and many roads. This has left Kaikōura better placed financially in 2021 than many councils, as they do not have to replace these in the next 30 years as part of their long-term planning.

=== Hospital ===
Funding was announced in 2013 to rebuild the 100-year-old Kaikoura Hospital. It was completed in April 2016 at a cost of $13.4 million. The new building provides space for general practice, physiotherapy, dental, optometry, maternity, radiology, and medical/trauma stabilisation and resuscitation facilities.

== Transport ==
=== Road ===
State Highway 1 passes through the town. The Inland Kaikōura Road, formally designated Route 70, is a local highway that runs from just south of Kaikōura to just north of Culverden via Waiau, Rotherham and Mount Lyford Village. It forms part of the Alpine Pacific Triangle touring route, and also serves as an alternative inland route for State Highway 1.

=== Air ===
Kaikōura has a small sealed airstrip located 6 km south of the main centre. Kaikoura Airport is mainly used for whale spotting tourist flights, but it can also be used by small private and charter flights. It previously had return flights to Wellington and Christchurch operated by Sounds Air. A new service to Wellington has since been started with Air Kaikoura.

=== Rail ===
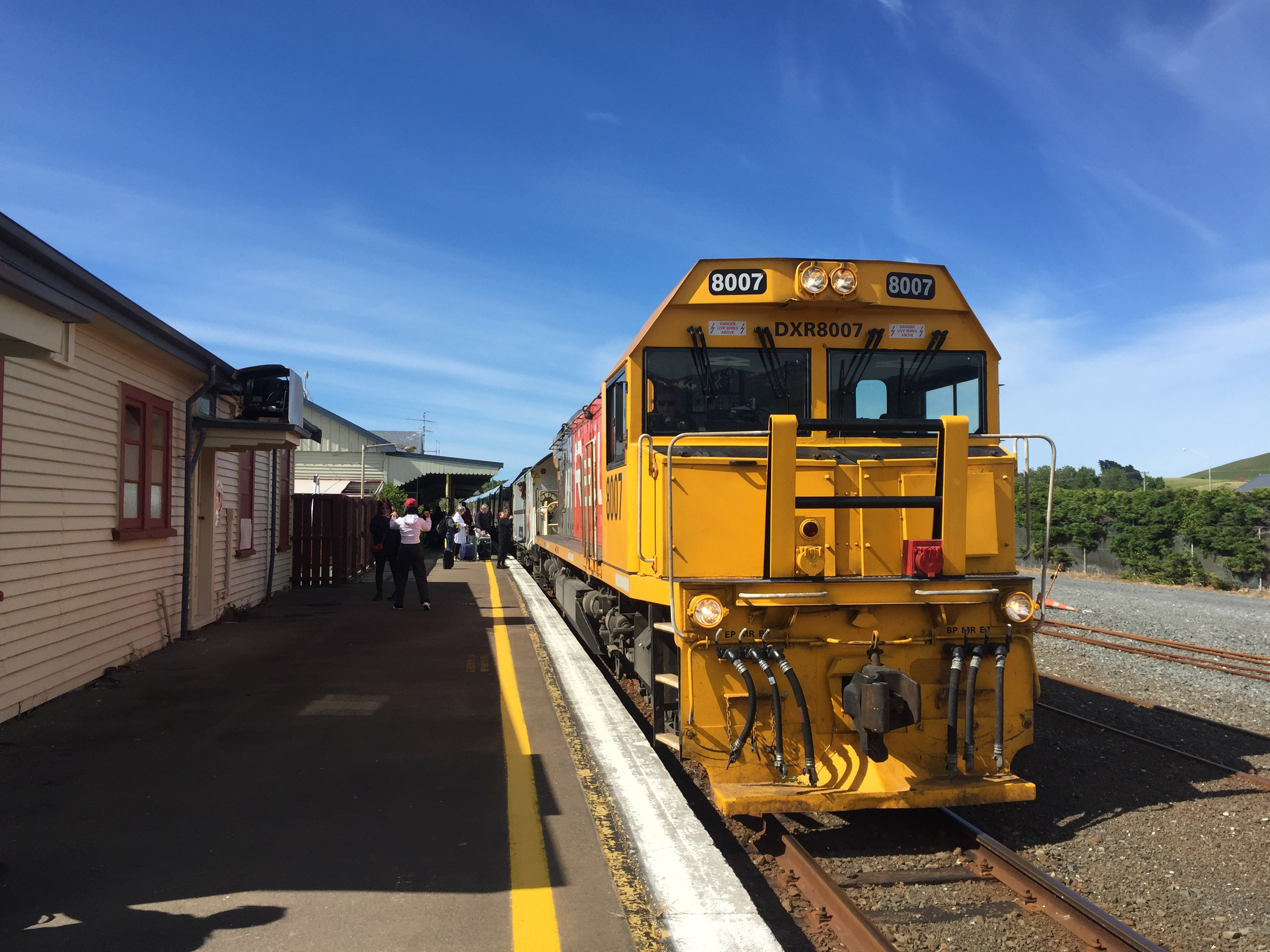
Coastal Pacific locomotive, Kaikōura

Kaikōura is served by the Main North Line, the northern section of the South Island Main Trunk Railway. The line opened north of Kaikōura on 13 March 1944, while the line south of the town opened on 15 December 1945, the latter completing the full line Christchurch to Picton.Passenger services are provided by the Coastal Pacific long-distance passenger train (known as the TranzCoastal from 2000–2011) which connects the town with Christchurch to the south, and Picton and the Cook Strait ferries to the north. Kaikōura Station was the last station in New Zealand to have a refreshment room for passengers. It closed in 1988 when the Picton Express was replaced with the Coastal Pacific Express which introduced on-board refreshments.

Freight trains also pass through the town, mainly carrying freight between the marshalling yards at Middleton in Christchurch and the Interislander rail ferries at Picton.

=== Whale Trail ===
The Whale Trail is a shared-use long-distance trail under construction from Picton to Kaikōura. The trail is being developed in sections and is expected to become one of the New Zealand Cycle Trail Great Rides on completion. In 2024, work began on the construction of a 13 km (8.1 mi) section from Kaikōura northwards to Hāpuku, based on upgrades to existing cycle routes including part of the Kaikōura Trail. By June, upgrades were completed to 3.3 km (2.1 mi) of existing trail from the centre of Kaikōura north to Middle Creek, and the Kaikōura District Council had committed funding to complete the upgrade of the 13 km (8.1 mi) section to Hāpuku.

== Education ==
Kaikōura High School is a state secondary school serving students in years 7 to 13. It had a roll of 191. It began as Ludstone School in 1866, a primary school which became Kaikoura Town School in 1876 on a new site. It became Kaikoura District High School in 1903, adding secondary education. The school burnt in 1905 and the secondary department was re-established in 1908. It became a separate school for forms 1 to 7 in 1971. It moved to the current site in 1979 and became Kaikōura High School.

Kaikōura Primary School and Kaikōura Suburban School are state contributing primary schools for years 1 to 6 with rolls of 120 and 54, respectively. They also originated in Kaikoura Town School in 1873 or 1876.

St Joseph's School is a state-integrated Catholic full primary school for years 1 to 8 with a roll of 110. The first Catholic school in Kaikōura opened in 1883. A new school opened in 1912. The present school opened in 1980, and became state-integrated in 1982.

All these schools are co-educational. Rolls are as of July 2026.

Hāpuku has the only other primary school in the Kaikōura District.

== Media ==
Kaikōura's main newspaper is the Wednesday weekly Kaikoura Star. The Marlborough Express ceased publication of its print edition in July 2025, but still publishes a free weekend edition. The early morning Monday-Saturday Christchurch-based daily The Press is also available. These papers are all owned by Fairfax New Zealand

Kaikōura has three locally transmitted radio stations on FM. These are More FM Marlborough (formerly Sounds FM) broadcast from Blenheim during the day and from Auckland at night, Blue FM which is a locally broadcast Kaikōura station, and Tahu FM broadcast from Christchurch. Non-local transmissions of the following stations can be received: The Breeze (Wellington AM/FM), Radio New Zealand National (Wellington AM/FM), ZM (Wellington and Christchurch FM), Radio Hauraki (Christchurch).

== Notable people ==
Notable people from Kaikōura include:

- Pat Boot – middle-distance runner who competed at the 1936 Summer Olympics and the 1938 British Empire Games, winning gold and bronze medals at the latter
- Thomas Cooke – posthumously awarded the Victoria Cross for gallantry at the Battle of Pozières during the First World War
- Ben Foster - sculptor
- Aston Greathead – artist
- Ted Howard – conservationist
- Trevor Howse – Ngāi Tahu leader and researcher
- Ronald Jorgensen – one of the perpetrators of the Bassett Road machine gun murders in 1963
- Sabrina Luecht - wildlife rehabilitator and conservationist
- Ailsa McGilvary – bird conservationist and photographer
- Bert Sandos – rower who competed at the 1930 British Empire Games, where he won two medals, and at the 1932 Summer Olympics
- Mark Solomon – Māori leader, kaiwhakahaere (chairperson) of Te Rūnanga o Ngāi Tahu, chair of the Canterbury District Health Board
- Julie Syme – community service leader
- Melville Syme – community service leader
- Dallas Tamaira – vocalist in Fat Freddy's Drop
- Ian Walker – long-serving Chief Fire Officer of the Kaikōura volunteer fire brigade
- Cora Wilding – physiotherapist noted for her advocacy of outdoor activities and children's health camps in the 1930s
- John Wood – diplomat and a former chancellor of the University of Canterbury

== Gallery ==
Kaikōura

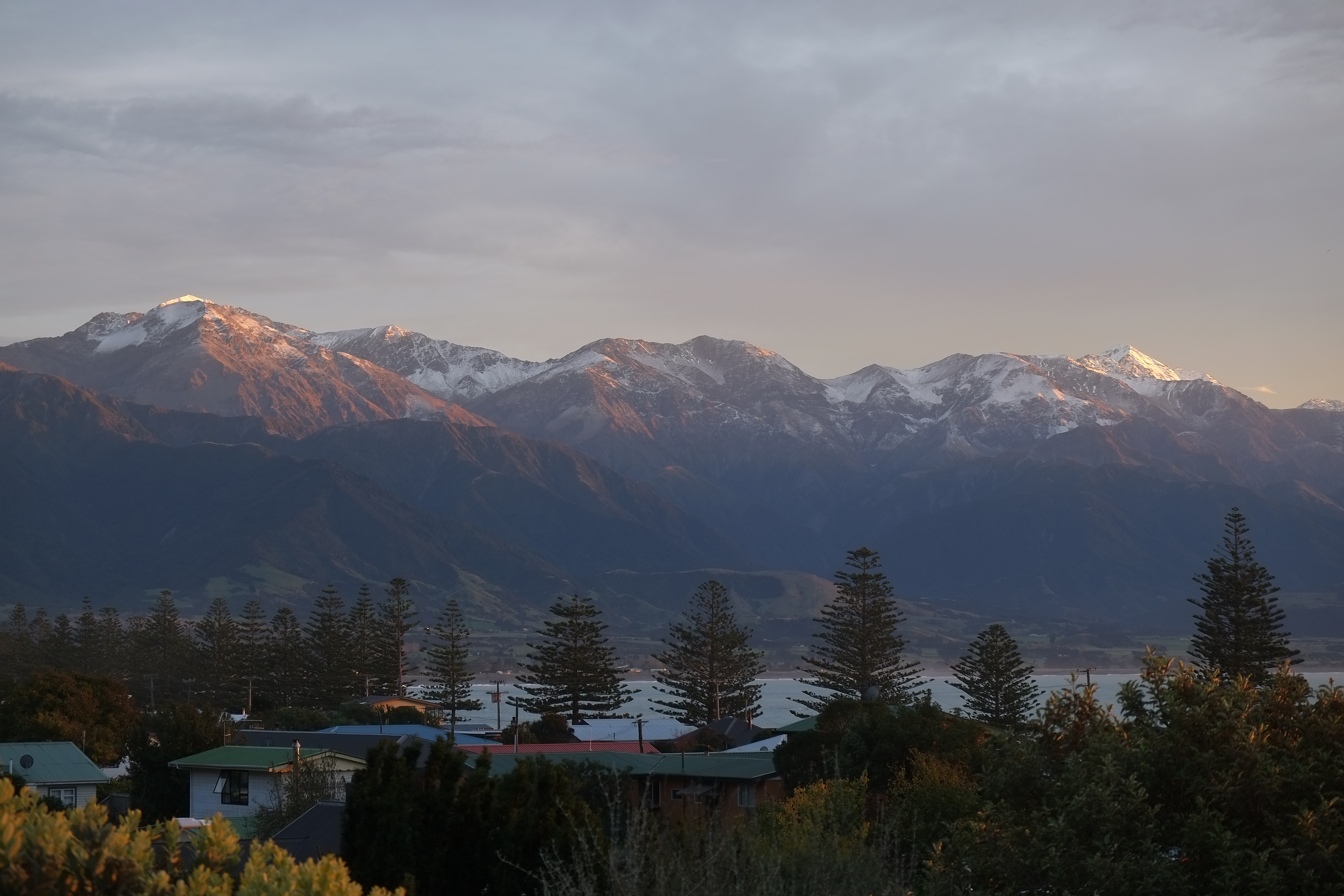
Seaward Kaikōura Range from Kaikōura town

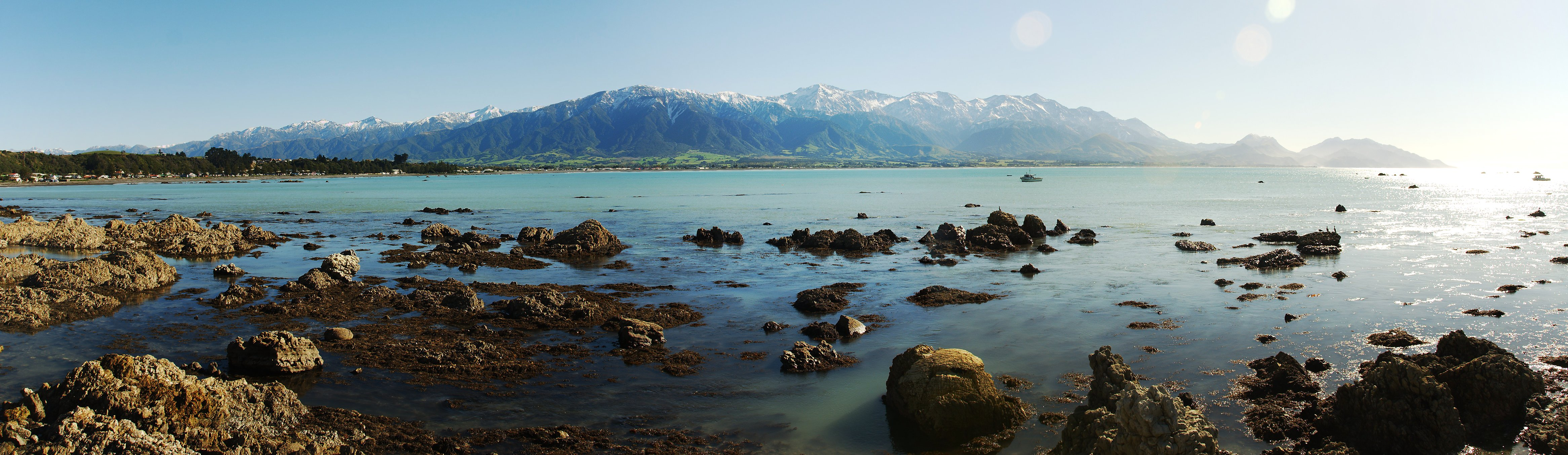
The Seaward Kaikōura mountain range from Kaikōura

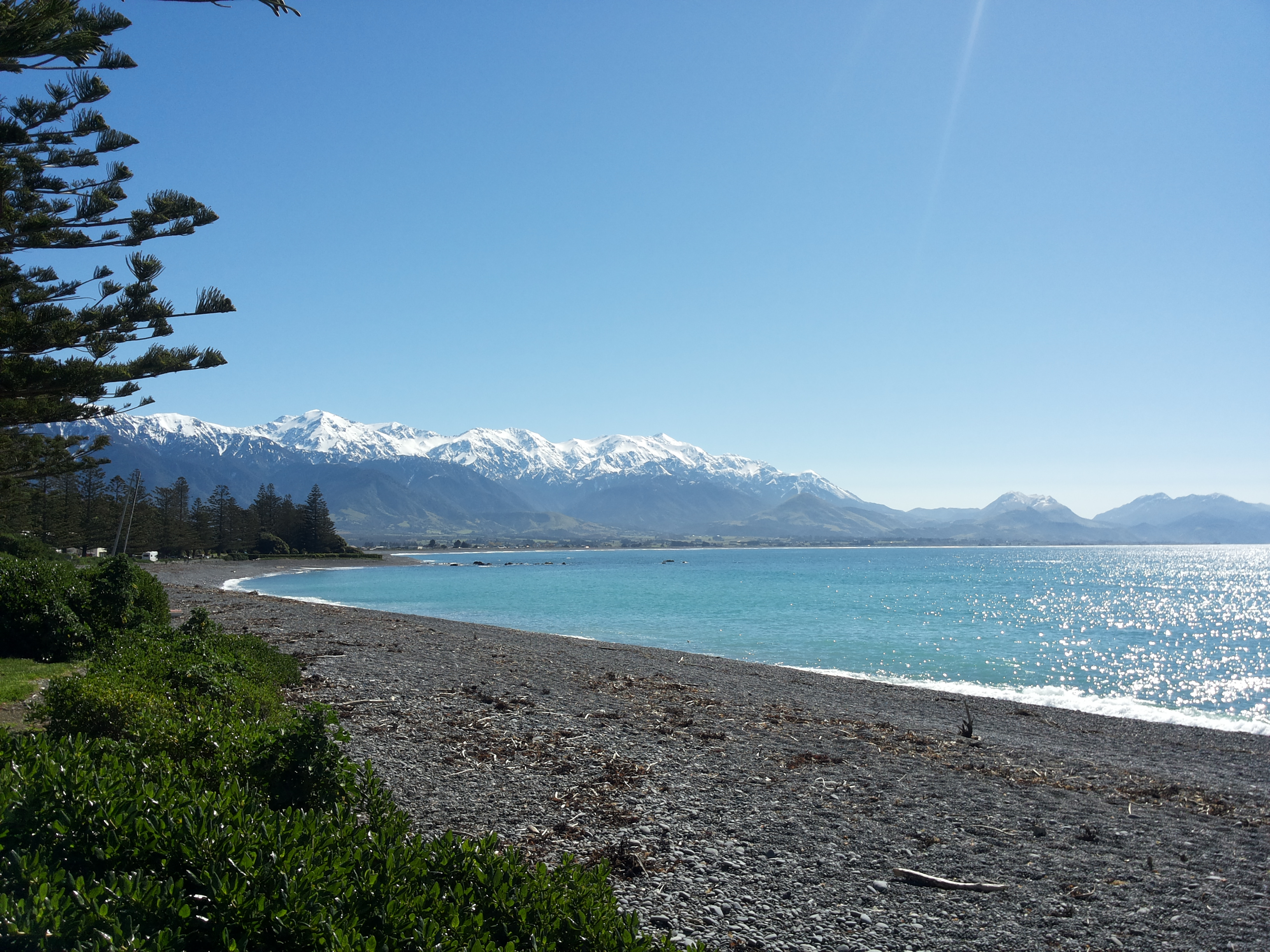
View of a beach and Seaward Kaikōura Range from Kaikōura

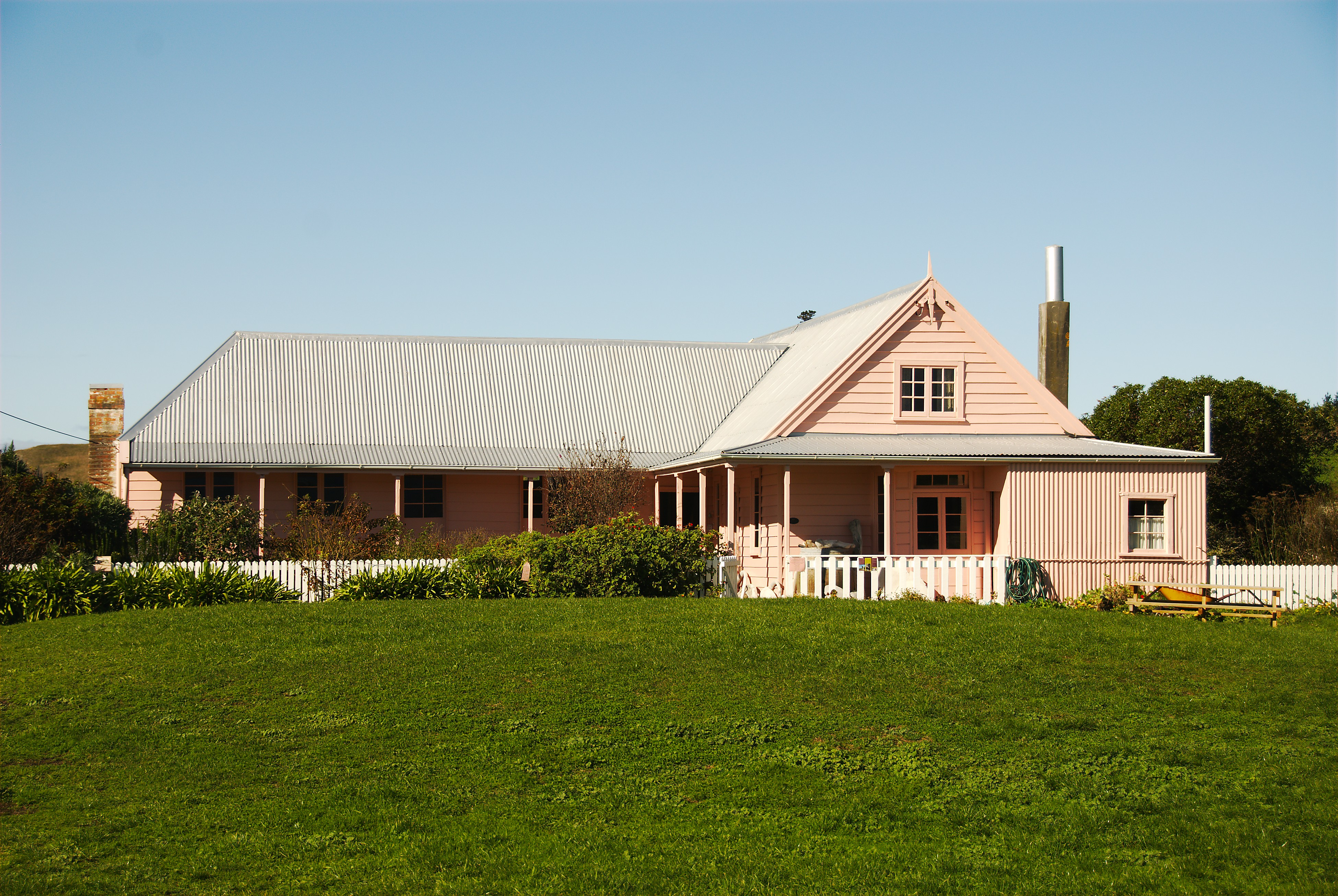
Fyffe House

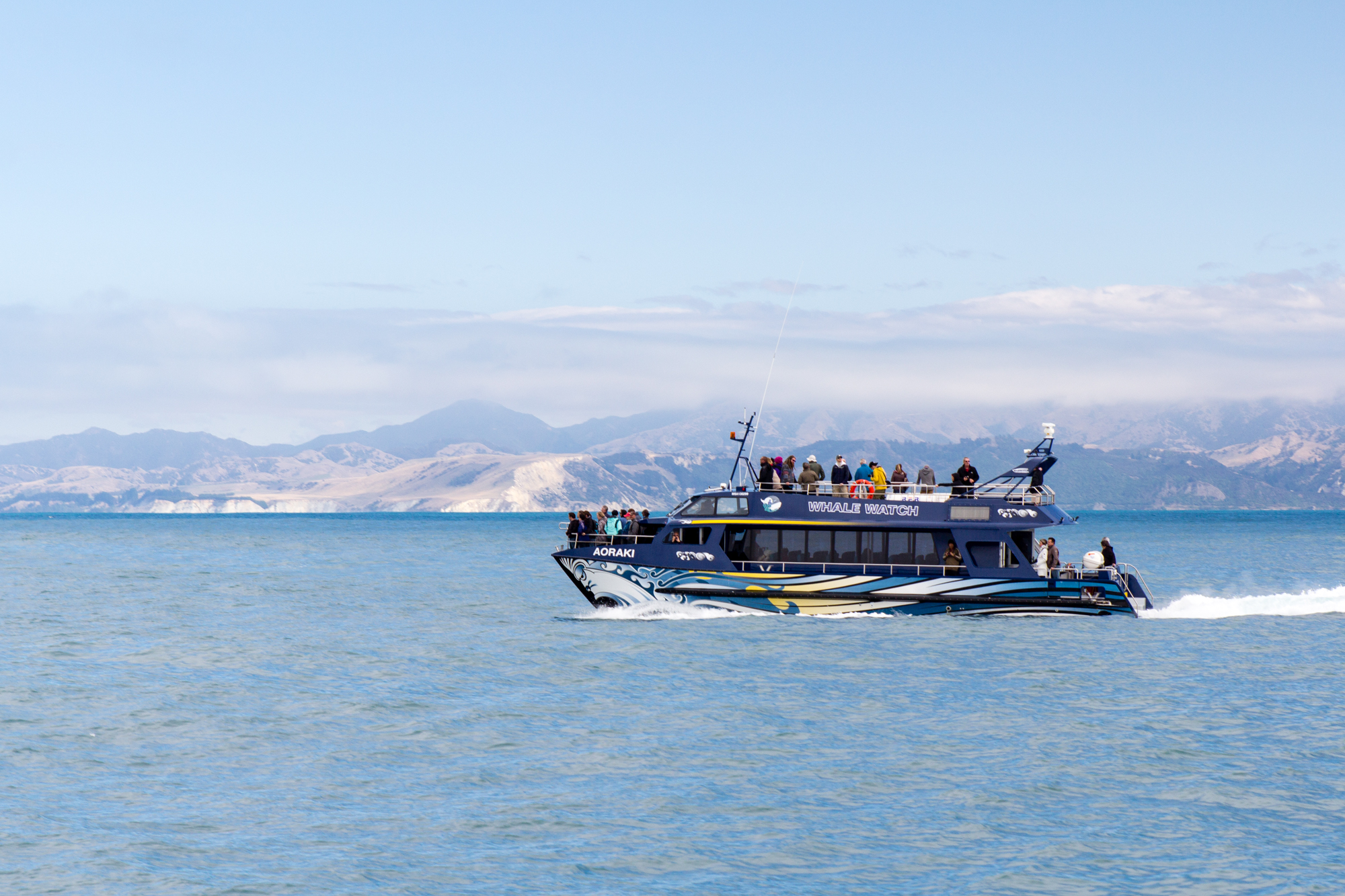
Whale watching vessel

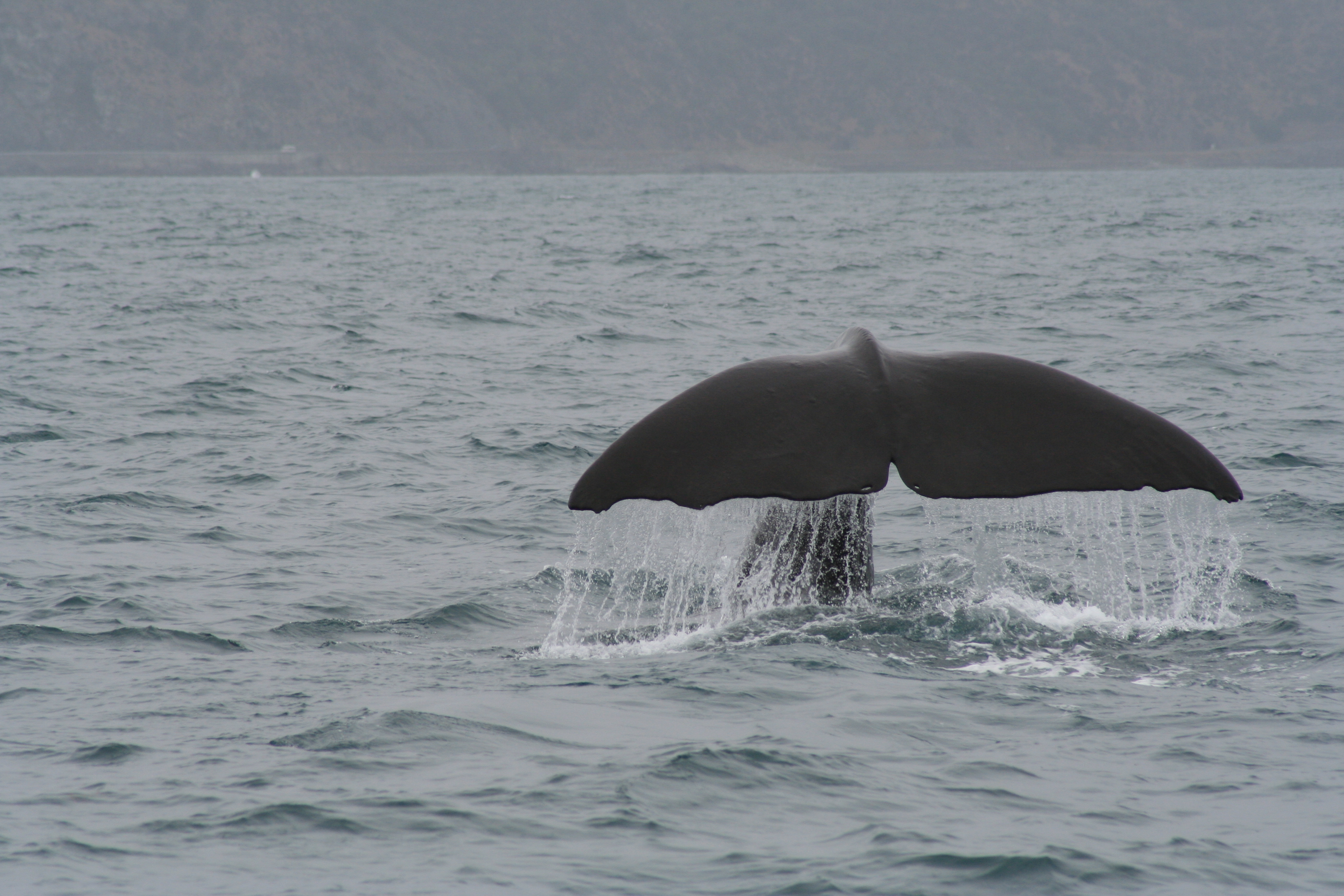
A sperm whale seen from on a whale-watching tour boat off Kaikōura

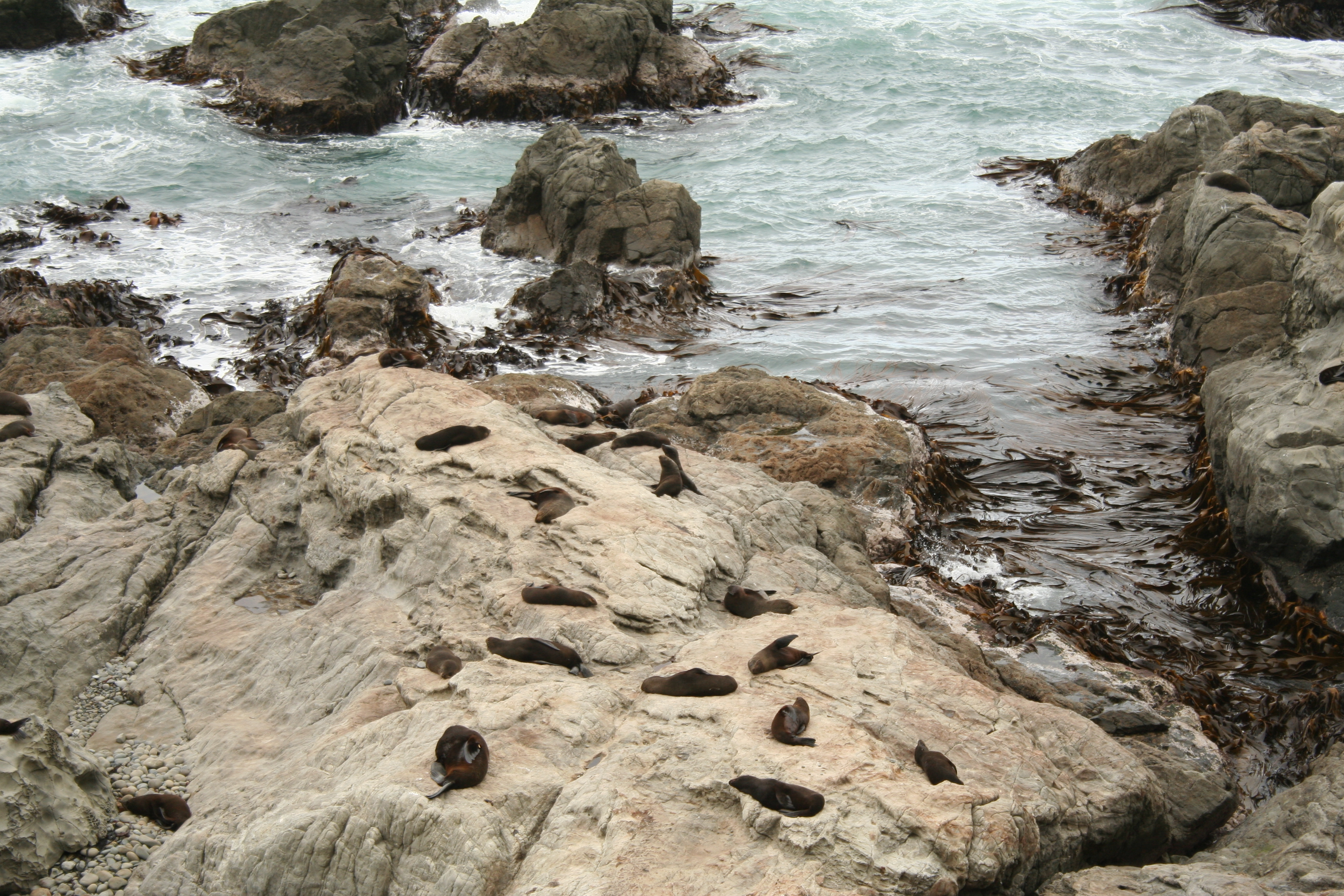
A seal colony on the Kaikōura peninsula

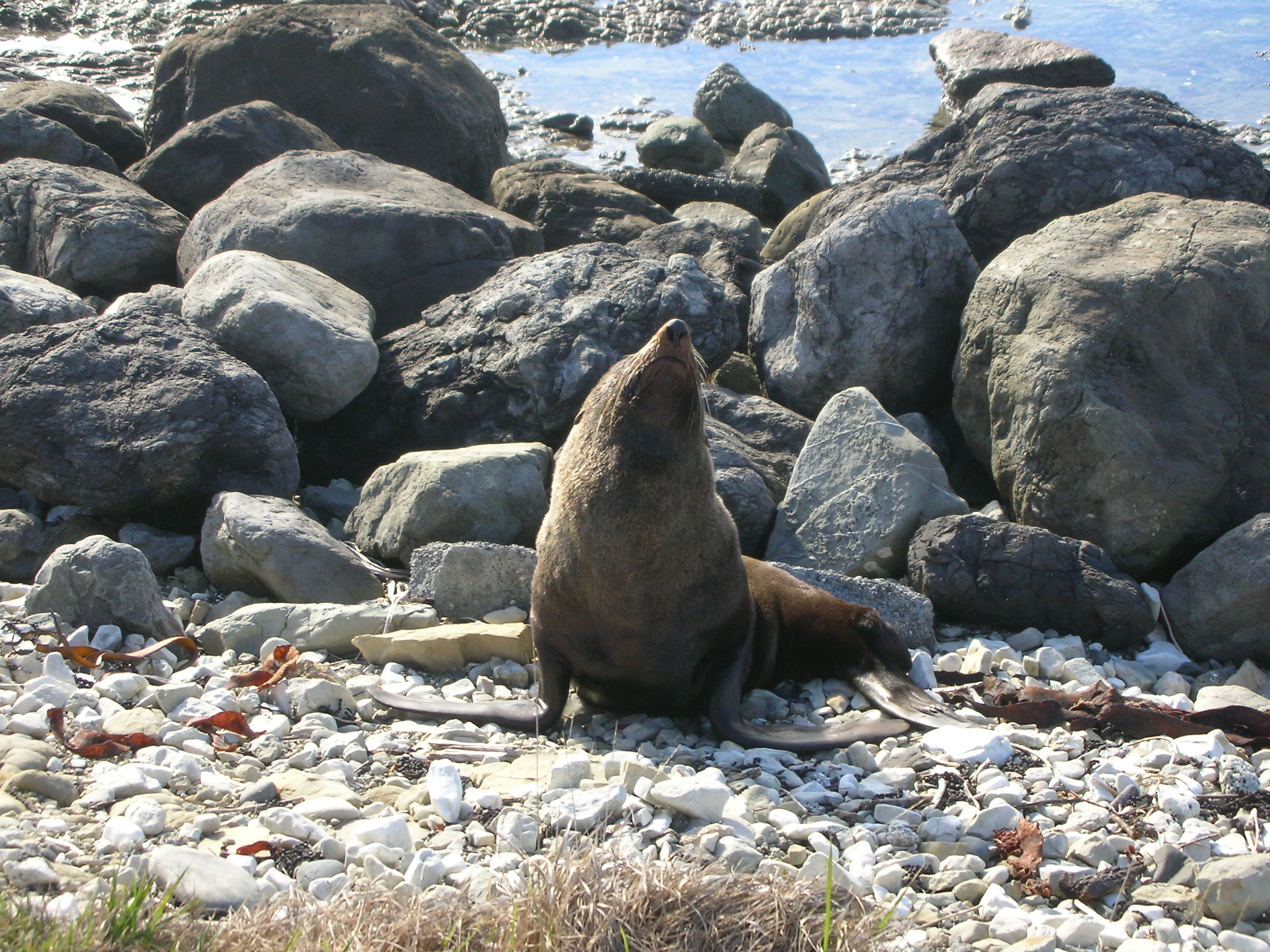
A fur seal on the beach at Kaikōura

== See also ==
- List of historic places in Kaikōura District
