= Robert Fyffe =

New Zealand whaler and runholder

- Born: Alexander Robert Fyffe c. 1811; Perthshire
- Died: April 1854; New Zealand
- Occupations: Whaler, Farmer
- Known for: Whaling

Alexander Robert Fyffe or Fyfe (c. 1811 – April 1854), known as Robert, was a New Zealand whaler and runholder. He was born in Perthshire, Scotland in c. 1811 to James Fyffe and Elizabeth Stewart.

At 19, Fyffe went to sea. In February 1836 he sailed from Sydney to Cloudy Bay in Marlborough, New Zealand on the schooner Industry. Also on board was New Zealand's first shore-based whaler, John (Jacky) Guard and his family. Fyffe worked for several years in the Marlborough whale fishery, but around 1842 he moved to establish a whaling station at Waiopuka on the Kaikōura Peninsula with John Murray, who he knew from Marlborough. Jacky Guard joined them between 1844 and 1846. They became the founders of the European settlement at Kaikōura. A landing spot for boats was called Fyffe Cove.

In 1845 Fyffe purchased a second station at South Bay, on the south side of the Kaikōura Peninsula. As the whaling industry declined due to overfishing, Fyffe diversified by getting involved in shipping and farming. He bought the schooner Fidèle in 1847, shipping supplies between Marlborough and Canterbury as far south as Akaroa. By 1849 he was grazing sheep belonging to Wellington businessman Robert Waitt on land near Kaikōura, sharing with Waitt the wool and increase in the flock. He ran his flock on a 200 square mile run between the Conway River and the Kaikōura Peninsula, eventually owning 2,000 head of stock. He also had 192 goats that had been introduced to provide milk for whalers, which were the origin of the wild goats that live in the Marlborough back country today.

Fyffe built a shearing and wool shed which used whale ribs as posts and crossbeams supporting a roof of toetoe, and his sheep yards were constructed with pieces of whale bone. Sheep were driven to the shed, the only one in the district, from surrounding runs. Fyffe's assortment of buildings became known as Fyffe's Village, and formed the social and business centre of Kaikōura until the mid-1860s. Fyffe built a house near the Waiopuka whaling station in the 1840s. The building, now known as Fyffe House, was later extended by Fyffe's cousin George Fyffe. It is still standing and is listed as a Heritage New Zealand Historic Place Category 1.

In 1852 the New Munster native secretary Henry Tacy Kemp gave Kaikōura Whakatau (leader of Ngāi Tahu in the Kaikōura district) £60 as settlement for his land claims in Kaikōura. Whakatau believed that this payment was only for Fyffe's whaling station at Waiopuka, and subsequently chased off government surveyors attempting to survey the Kaikōura coastline.

In December 1853, Fyffe's cousin (Note: Some sources state that George was Robert's nephew, but they were both grandsons of John Fyffe and Anna Scot.) George Fyffe arrived in Wellington from Scotland, having accepted Robert Fyffe's invitation to join him at Kaikōura. However in late April 1854 the Fidèle capsized and was wrecked on a voyage to Wellington with a cargo of whale oil, and Robert Fyffe was drowned. As he had not yet changed his will in favour of George, the executor of Fyffe's estate published an advertisement seeking his heirs. The advertisement was seen by Fyffe's widowed sister Elizabeth Laird who was living in New York at the time. She attempted to locate their brother James Fyfe who was also supposed to be living in New York. Following a demand in 1861 by Fyffe's executor that any heirs appear in person at the solicitor's office in Wellington, Laird and her family arrived in New Zealand in 1862. Laird inherited £18,000 pounds and her son William Laird went to Kaikōura to assume control of Fyffe's property. Meanwhile, George Fyffe had bought Robert Fyffe's fishing rights and ran the whaling station until 1866, while managing his own run and that of his late cousin. George Fyffe died in 1867.
