= Sabrina Luecht =

New Zealand conservationist

- Born: 1984 or 1985 (age 41–42); Germany
- Education: University of Canterbury
- Occupations: Wildlife rehabilitator; conservationist
- Known for: Bird conservation
- Spouse: Ben Foster

Sabrina Luecht (born 1984 or 1985) is a New Zealand wildlife rehabilitator and conservation advocate based in Kaikōura on the east coast of the South Island. She is the founder of Kaikōura Wildlife Rescue, and is certified as a wildlife rehabilitator by the Department of Conservation.

== Early life ==
Born in 1984 or 1985, Luecht grew up in Berlin, Germany, and emigrated to New Zealand with her mother and sister, to live in Hokitika on the West Coast of the South Island. She was raised with an interest in animals, and graduated with a Bachelor of Science degree in zoology from the University of Canterbury in 2006.

== Career ==
After graduating from Canterbury, Luecht worked for the New Zealand Forest Research Institute and Environment Canterbury. She then took a position with the US Fish and Wildlife Service as a seabird technician, responsible for banding albatross in the North Western Hawaiian Islands. Following that appointment she was involved in monitoring birdlife in Missouri, Tasmania and Christmas Island, and had several periods of work with the Department of Conservation. Luecht then took a position with the Isaac Conservation and Wildlife Trust in Christchurch, working on captive breeding of endangered New Zealand species.

=== Wildlife rehabilitation ===
In 2014, Luecht began work with rehabilitating endemic New Zealand species from her base in Hokitika. She did not advertise her services, but worked exclusively with the local vetenary clinic and the Department of Conservation. Luecht later moved to Kaikōura and established Kaikōura Wildlife Rescue in September 2017. The waters off Kaikōura support a wide variety of seabirds, and the region is designated as an Important Bird Area. Kaikōura has been described as "one of the best places in the world to see seabirds", with an exceptional diversity of albatross species.

The first animal Luecht treated in Kaikōura was a little penguin (kororā), dropped off two weeks before the new rescue centre was opened. At that point, the project was entirely self-funded. The species that she has treated are mostly seabirds, including little penguins, yellow-eyed penguins, shearwaters, petrels, gulls and shags. The workload peaks in the summer season, with winter as a quieter time.

Kaikōura Wildlife Rescue has a ten-year permit for wildlife rehabilitation issued by the Department of Conservation under the Wildlife Act.

In 2021, Luecht and her supporters established the Kaikōura Wildlife Centre Trust with the aim of creating a wildlife hospital and centre for conservation in the town. A brand, Project Wellbird, has been created as part of the initiative.

=== Conservation advocacy ===
In 2020, Luecht raised awareness of the severe environmental conditions affecting seabirds that were leading to some endangered birds starving to death. She has advocated in particular for red-billed gulls (tarāpunga). There is a nationally significant breeding colony of red-billed gulls on the Kaikōura Peninsula, but it is in serious decline. Luecht has provided supplementary feeding for the gulls using donated fish that is past its use-by-date. In 2021, she stated that it "was the fifth year in a row we have witnessed seabird die-offs across species in New Zealand, beginning in early spring". Stray cats have been another continuing threat for the colony of red-billed gulls on the Kaikōura Peninsula. In 2025, Luecht estimated that there are hundreds of stray cats on the peninsula, and reported that on some nights up to ten gulls have been killed.

Domestic cats are a critical threat to seabirds in the Kaikōura area, and Luecht frequently treats birds with injuries inflicted by cats. She owns a cat herself, and sets an example by keeping her cat at home, and exercising it on a lead.

Luecht has also advocated for the Hutton's shearwater, an endangered bird that is frequently found in Kaikōura after crash-landing in the town at night. It is the only seabird in the world that is known to breed in alpine areas, and its only two remaining breeding colonies are located in the Seaward Kaikōura Ranges above the town. In the breeding season, the birds fly into and out of their breeding colonies in the hours of darkness, passing close to the town. They can be disoriented by bright lights at night, leading to problems with adult and newly fledged birds crash-landing in the streets of Kaikōura. They are often unable to move far after crash-landing and are vulnerable to being run over by vehicles or attacked by predators. Luecht has advocated for installation of illuminated warning signs at each end of the town between September and April, to warn visitors that birds may be on the roads.

In 2025, the Kaikōura Wildlife Centre Trust established Project Bluebird as a community initiative to protect the remaining small local population of little penguins. The birds are vulnerable to predation by dogs and cats and are also at risk of starvation from decreased ocean productivity as a result of climate change and overfishing. Supplementary feeding was provided to give the penguins a better chance of survival, and a campaign was launched to decrease human disturbance at the nesting sites. Visitors had been seeking out the nesting locations to view the birds, but Luecht has said that "beyond keeping penguins alive, addressing incessant human disturbance is currently critical to give the few remaining kororā a chance”. Project Bluebird aimed to provide fenced-off coastal areas and nesting boxes where penguins can safely come ashore to breed. Over the 2025–2026 summer period, there were only 12 nesting pairs in the colony, so with support from the South Island Wildlife Hospital, Luecht uplifted underweight fledglings from the colony to feed them and build up their condition.

In September 2026, Luecht reported that the local kororā population was down to less than 50 birds, and was weakened as a result of seasonal starvation caused by depleted fish stocks and climate change. Luecht urged that the local colony of kororā should be vaccinated against the H5N1 virus that was expected to arrive in the region imminently, in a similar approach to that taken in Australia for 6,000 little penguins at St Kilda and Phillip Island. The proposal was rejected by the Department of Conservation and the Minister of Conservation, Tama Potaka. Luecht warned that mass mortality of the local penguin population was likely without vaccination.

In response to the observations of starving seabirds in the Kaikōura region, Luecht said in 2026 that "we need to consider increasing marine reserve coverage in our waters … and perhaps review certain fishing quotas".

== Affiliations ==
Luecht is affiliated with a range of conservation organisations in Kaikōura, including Forest & Bird Kaikōura, the Hutton's Shearwater Charitable Trust, the Banded Dotterel Study Kaikōura, and Love The Lyell. She is also a member of Te Korowai o Te Tai o Marokura, an organisation focussed on strategies for management of the coastal seas around the Kaikōura region.

== Personal life ==
Luecht has a rare autoimmune disease, myasthenia gravis, and as of 2016 she was receiving treatment with regular infusions of antibodies derived from plasma extracted from donated blood.

Luecht lives in Kaikōura with her partner Ben Foster, a sculptor.
