= Geoff Harrow =

New Zealand conservationist

Geoff Harrow QSM
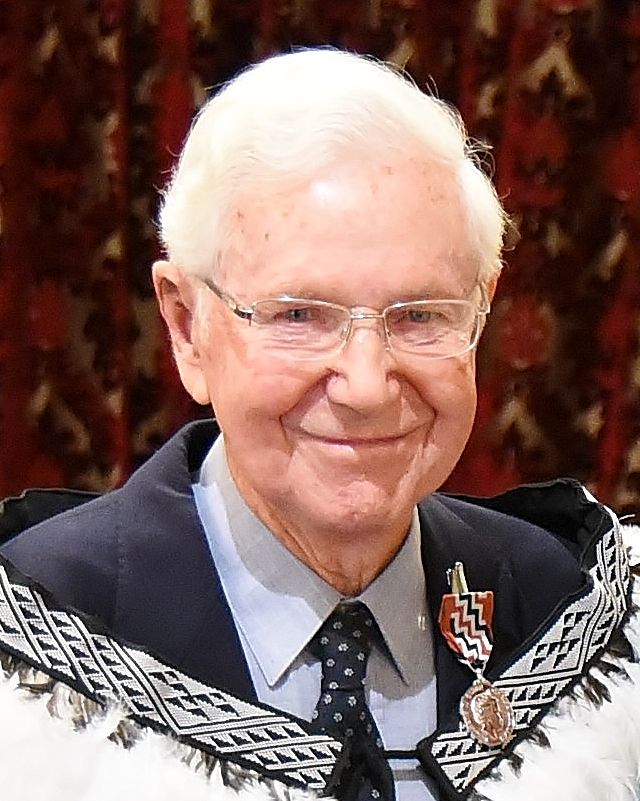
- Harrow in 2017
- Born: Geoffrey Harrow; 20 December 1926
- Died: 16 January 2023 (aged 96); Christchurch, New Zealand
- Known for: Hutton's shearwater conservation
- Spouse: Lyndsey Alston (m. 1957)
- Relatives: Alan Low (brother-in-law)

Geoffrey Harrow QSM (20 December 1926 – 16 January 2023) was a New Zealand amateur ornithologist and mountaineer. On 21 February 1965, Harrow rediscovered nesting grounds of the threatened Hutton's shearwater (Puffinus huttoni) or Kaikōura tītī, at 1,200–1,800 m (3,900–5,900 ft) in the Seaward Kaikōura mountains. He devoted the following 50 years to helping save the species from extinction.

== Early life and family ==
Born on 20 December 1926, Harrow was the youngest child of Edward John and Rachel Harrow. One of his sisters, Kathleen, married the economist Alan Low. Harrow spent his early years in Ashburton, later in Christchurch, and spent hours studying birds. Growing up in the Great Depression, he had the most comprehensive collection of birds' eggs of anyone at Riccarton School. He joined Forest & Bird aged 12, and completed his secondary education at Christchurch Boys' High School.

== Mountaineer ==
Harrow developed a passion for tramping and climbing from the age of 14, after meeting members of the Canterbury Mountaineering Club on a visit to Arthur's Pass. He had cycled from Christchurch. He was one of the few to have climbed all the 3,000-metre (9,800 ft) peaks in New Zealand, and climbed every peak in the Aoraki / Mount Cook National Park within four years. He achieved a number of first ascents. He was also a founding member of the Craigieburn Ski Club, where he met his wife Lyndsey in 1955. Harrow became engaged to Lyndsey Alston in 1956, and the couple married the following year.

Hugh Logan, a mountaineer and former head of the Department of Conservation and the New Zealand Antarctic Programme, spoke of Harrow's skill and stamina as a mountaineer, and of his "explosion onto the climbing and mountaineering scene", paying tribute to Harrow's climbing and mountaineering skill as a teen, climbing Mt Armstrong (2,110m) at the head of the Waimakariri River in Arthur's Pass in about 1946. In January 1953, Harrow climbed the east face of Mount Sefton (3,151 m). This was described as "a breakthrough for a new climbing generation that sparked a modern phase of New Zealand mountaineering. It was the first such climb by a guideless party and the first occasion on which a face of such steepness and exposure had been attempted in New Zealand, causing New Zealand climbers to rethink what was technically possible."

Harrow was on the 1954 Edmund Hillary-led NZAC Himalayan Expedition to climb the 8,463-metre (27,766 ft) Mt Makalu, when Hillary was evacuated to safety after he broke several ribs trying to rescue fellow climber, Jim McFarlane, from a crevasse. Harrow then climbed Baruntse (7,162 m) in the Himalayas with Colin Todd on 30 May 1954.

In June 1966, Harrow had a narrow miss when an avalanche on Mount Rolleston killed Jeffrey Wilby, Bruce Ferguson, Colin Robertson and Michael Harper in one of New Zealand's worst alpine disasters. Harrow had sensed danger and refused to camp in the area overnight. In 1966, he also spent months providing specialist advice to penguin researchers and helped establish the Canterbury Mountain Rescue Radio service in 1967.

== Hutton's shearwater – rediscovery ==
The Hutton's shearwater was first formally described by Gregory Mathews in 1912 and named in honour of Frederick Hutton, former curator of the Canterbury Museum, Christchurch, who died in 1905. It took 50 years for the species to be confirmed correctly as the Hutton's shearwater. The birds were known in Kaikōura from the regular occurrences of crash-landings in the town during autumn, but the location of their nesting sites was unknown.

In 1964, while visiting Kaikōura in his job as a pharmaceutical representative, Harrow learnt from a local, Ivan Hislop, that the elusive Hutton's shearwater was probably nesting high up in the Kowhai Valley, the only seabird to nest so far inland, but nothing was confirmed. The New Zealand bird photographer and author M. F. Soper had told Harrow he knew of no seabird that nested at such height and the former director of the then National Museum, Robert Falla, wrote that up to 1965 "every accessible islet and stack from Banks Peninsula to Cook Strait had been examined by field parties with no result". However, with encouragement from Soper, Harrow returned to Kaikōura to follow up on the lead obtained from Hislop.

Harrow became determined to find the birds, and drawing on his considerable skills as a tramper and mountaineer, he climbed into difficult mountainous country, finding three carcasses and had them identified by Falla in Wellington. Harrow reported his discovery to Ngāi Tahu and Ngāti Kurī kaumātua, who recognised the bird as the Kaikōura tītī, sometimes called the mountain muttonbird, a taonga that had been a valuable food source for Māori.

Harrow's re-discovery of the nesting sites of the highest breeding seabirds in the world was likened at the time to the discovery by Geoffrey Orbell of the previously considered extinct takahē, near Lake Te Anau in the Murchison Mountains in 1948. The location of Hutton's shearwater's nesting grounds had been one of New Zealand's great unsolved natural mysteries. Over many years, Harrow made frequent trips up the Kowhai Valley, working along all the ranges in every high basin both on the Seaward and Inland Kaikōuras often alone and at weekends to locate, monitor and record as many birds as he could. He found eight nesting sites, although within 20 years only two remained, as a result of predation by stoats, pigs and kea. On one of these trips, Harrow's son Paul discovered a rare and distinctive black-eyed species of gecko, (Hoplodactylus kahutarae).

The first Hutton's shearwater colony Harrow found was remote, and access particularly difficult, so he asked local residents where another colony might be accessible for the purposes of monitoring and research. One response from Sam Pilbrow of Puhi Peaks Station, reported that birds would crash into the lights of the homestead on foggy nights between September and March. After several visits to explore the western area of the station, Harrow discovered a breeding colony on steep bluffs. This is now known as the Shearwater Stream colony. This colony on the Puhi Peaks Station is one of the only two remaining natural breeding colonies of the endangered Hutton's shearwater. Harrow wrote a series of reports for the Ornithological Society of New Zealand's journal Notornis, and he knew the birds needed closer attention, saying "I'm not an ornithologist; I'm not a scientist".

Over three years from 1996, Richard Cuthbert, then a PhD student and also a keen mountaineer, continued Harrow's work, with the support of the Department of Conservation and a scholarship from the University of Otago. He met and worked with Harrow and they became friends.

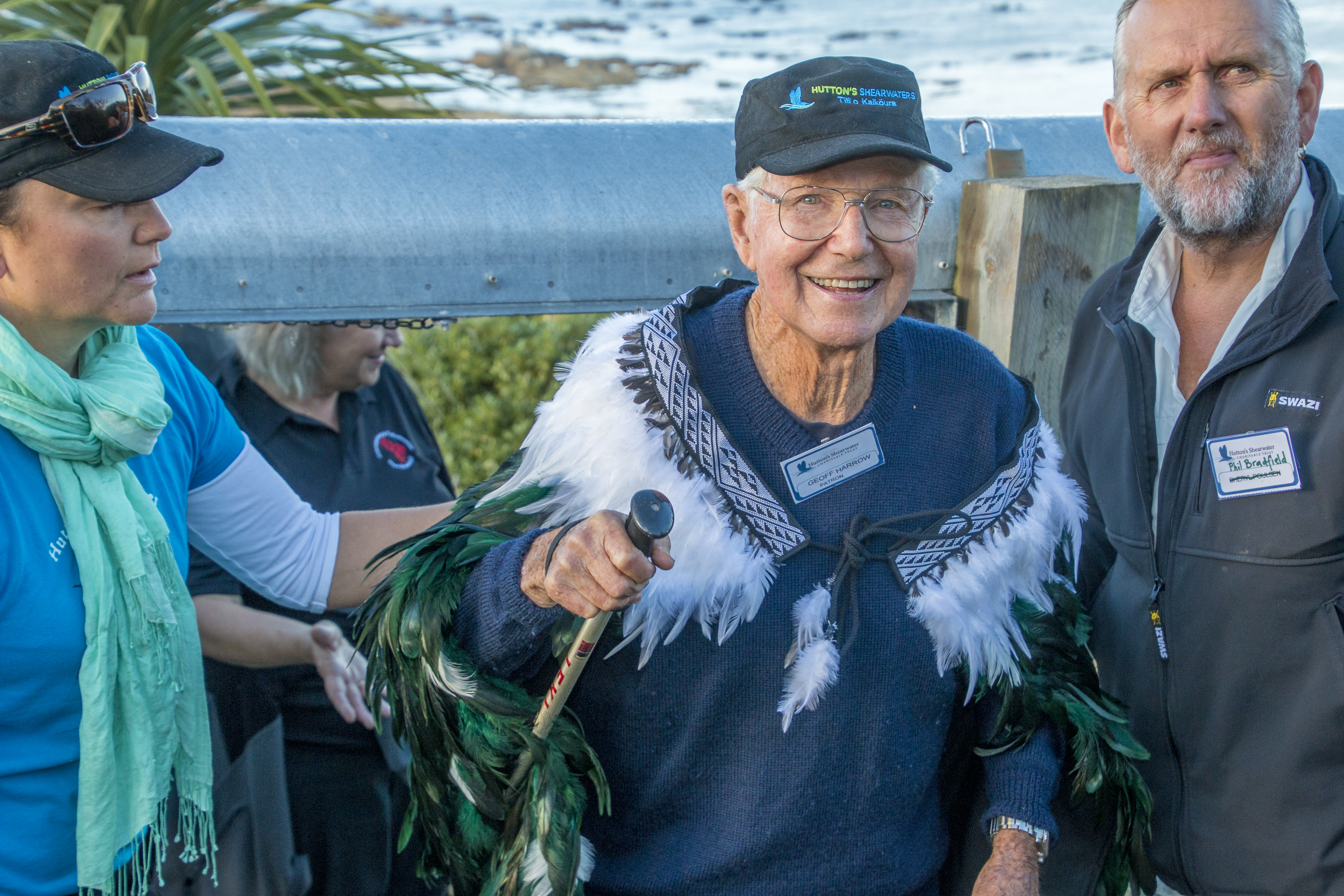
Harrow entering Te Rae O Atiu Hutton's shearwater colony in 2016

Harrow founded the Hutton's Shearwater Charitable Trust in October 2008, and with the support of his wife Lyndsey, raised $300,000 within the first year to draw national attention to their plight. An artificial colony for the birds, Te Rae o Atiu, was established by the Trust on Kaikōura Peninsula in 2005, with translocations of about 10 young birds. By 2024, the population had reached about 100. A predator-proof fence was erected in 2010. Further translocations took place in 2012 and 2013. The Trust now partners with the Department of Conservation, Te Rūnanga o Kaikōura and Whale Watch Kaikōura to manage this artificial colony and the project remains a source of pride in Kaikōura. Harrow was a committee member of the Trust until 2013 and a patron until his death.

Harrow believed that there was a couple of million birds in the area he knew, which was reduced by about 500,000 in 25 years. On 13 November 2016, the 7.8-magnitude 2016 Kaikōura earthquake destroyed three sub-colonies of shearwaters, buried under thousands of tonnes of rock. The earthquake occurred while adult birds were brooding eggs in burrows. It is estimated that in the areas affected by major landslips, around 40,000 birds were killed, with a further 80,000 possibly killed in burrows in other areas.

== Later life ==
Harrow climbed Mount Kilimanjaro in Kenya aged 72, and skied into his 90s. He died in Christchurch on 16 January 2023, at the age of 96. To his family, Harrow was "the all-or nothing man, black and white", his daughter Belinda said. "He was either totally and utterly boots and all into something, or not at all and like that about everything, a driven, self-confessed obsessive. He was an optimist, a do-it-yourselfer and an enthusiastic booster of others."

== Honours and awards ==
On 20 February 2015, 50 years to the day after his discovery, Harrow was honoured with a korowai, and made a kaumātua to celebrate his long involvement with the Hutton's shearwater. The ceremony was attended by representatives from Ngāti Kurī, Ngāi Tahu, the Hutton's Shearwater Trust, local land owners, Department of Conservation, volunteers and the community.

Harrow was awarded the Queen's Service Medal in the 2017 New Year Honours, for his services to conservation and mountaineering, and also received a Forest & Bird Old Blue Award.
