= Manakau (disambiguation) =

Manakau may mean:

- Manakau, a small town in the Horowhenua district of New Zealand
- Manakau (mountain), a peak in the Seaward Kaikoura Range, New Zealand

== See also ==
- Manukau, a major suburb of Auckland, New Zealand
