= Ka Whata Tu O Rakihouia Conservation Park =

Conservation area in the South Island of New Zealand

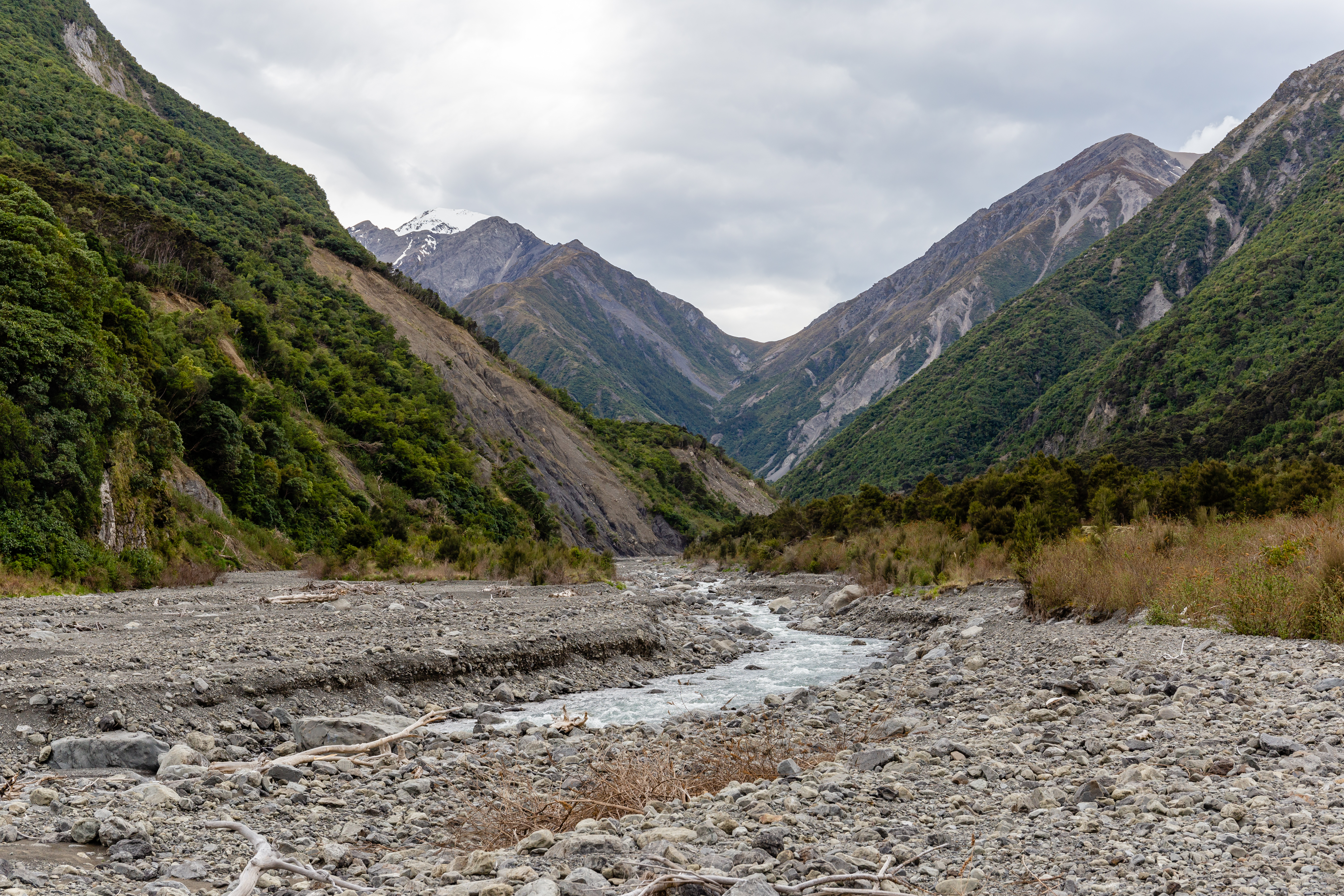
- Kowhai River in the Kaikoura Ranges
- Interactive map of Ka Whata Tu O Rakihouia Conservation Park
- Location: Kaikōura District
- Nearest city: Kaikōura
- Coordinates: 42.385464°S 173.449069°E
- Area: 88,065 hectares (217,610 acres)
- Established: 2008
- Governing body: Department of Conservation

Ka Whata Tu O Rakihouia Conservation Park is a protected area covering part of the Seaward Kaikoura Range. It is located between Kaikōura and Clarence in the Kaikōura District and Canterbury Region of New Zealand's South Island.

The main breeding colony of the endangered Hutton's shearwater is located in the headwaters of the Kowhai River. The area of the colony is protected as the Mount Uwerau Nature Reserve. This is a strict nature reserve of 1,102 ha (2,720 acres) within the Ka Whata Tu o Rakihouia Conservation Park where no public access is permitted.

The park is managed by the New Zealand Department of Conservation.

== Geography ==
The park covers 88,065 hectares (217,610 acres).

== History ==
The park was established in 2008.
