= Splendrillia majorina =

Scientific classification
- Kingdom: Animalia
- Phylum: Mollusca
- Class: Gastropoda
- Subclass: Caenogastropoda
- Order: Neogastropoda
- Superfamily: Conoidea
- Family: Drilliidae
- Genus: Splendrillia
- Species: S. majorina

Binomial name
- Splendrillia majorina Beu, 1979

Species of gastropod

Splendrillia majorina is a species of sea snail, a marine gastropod mollusk in the family Drilliidae.

This extant species is also described as a fossil from the Pliocene off Kaikōura Peninsula, New Zealand.

== Description ==
The shell is large, tall, and narrow, measuring 27.9 mm in height and 10.9 mm in diameter, with convex spire outlines, a short siphonal canal, concave shoulders, a subsutural fold, and a deep shoulder sinus. The inner lip is uncallused or lightly callused. The protoconch is smooth, dome-shaped, and large. Collabral sculpture has large, widely spaced folds, 9 to 11 per whorl. Spiral sculpture includes three cords on spire whorls and 10 to 12 on the last whorl, with fine threads in between. The siphonal canal is short, wide, slightly dorsally turned, and spout-like.

== Distribution ==
This marine species is endemic to New Zealand and occurs off Ninety Mile Beach, North Island.

It was originally described as fossil.
