= Ben Foster (sculptor) =

New Zealand sculptor (born 1976 or 1977)

- Born: 1976 or 1977 (age 48–49)
- Occupation: Sculptor
- Website: benfostersculpture.com

Ben Foster (born 1976 or 1977) is a New Zealand sculptor based in Kaikōura. Before becoming a sculptor, he worked as a furniture maker.

== Biography ==
Starting at age 16, Foster undertook a diploma in visual arts at the Eastern Institute of Technology in Napier. He later started working as a furniture maker and a boat builder and eventually started studying at the Christchurch Polytechnic Institute of Technology. For two years he commuted from Kaikōura to Christchurch.

In about 2004 Foster started pursuing a bachelor of visual arts degree at Nelson Marlborough Institute of Technology (NMIT). He moved to Nelson for his studies; in 2005 he lived in Ruby Bay. Foster moved to Kaikōura in about 2005. When he first moved to the town he expected to be a furniture maker for five years and make art as side projects during that time, but instead he was making art full time within a year. In 2017 Foster planned on moving to Switzerland for six months in 2018 to work on a project.

Foster renovated the Kaikōura Wildlife Rescue facility that was opened in October 2016 by his partner Sabrina Luecht.

== Selected list of works ==
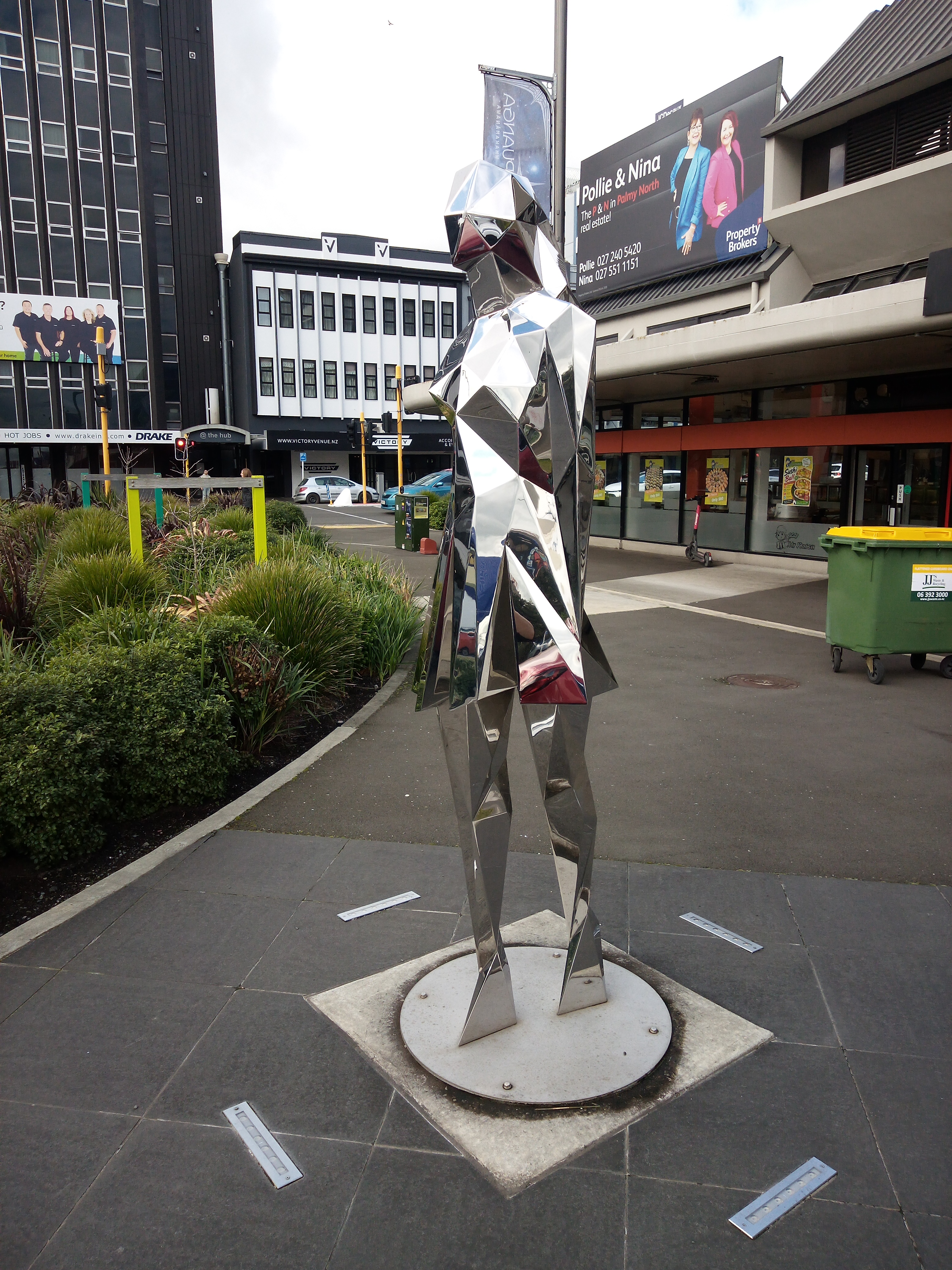
"Kotahitanga" by Ben Foster (2023). Cuba Street, Palmerston North. Female figure.

In 2005 Foster was commissioned to make a sculpture for the Kaikōura-based business Dolphin Encounter. The sculpture is named Encouter and is 1.5 metres (4 ft 11 in) tall, 1.3 metres (4 ft 3 in) wide and weighs approximately 900 kilograms (2,000 lb). That year he also worked on a sculpture for the Nelson-Tasman Chamber of Commerce.

In 2010 Foster made the sculpture People go Round for the Timaru District Heartland Sculpture Challenge in Timaru. It was 4.5 metres (15 ft) tall, was made of aluminium, steel and paint, and featured 95 cm (37 in)-long "blades of human figures".

In September 2017 a sculpture by Foster was unveiled at the Kaikōura railway station. It was commissioned by KiwiRail to commemorate the rebuilding of the area's railway line after the 2016 Kaikōura earthquake damaged it and to celebrate the return of freight trains to the area. The sculpture includes the names of several nearby towns affected by the earthquake, but was criticised for not including Rakautara.

Foster submitted one of the 13 design ideas for a pedestrian bridge in Christchurch as part of a competition by the Christchurch City Council. Foster's design was inspired by the Southern Alps and Aoraki / Mount Cook. In 2019 the council decided not to use any of the designs submitted in the competition due to concerns about maintenance costs.

In 2019 a sculpture by Foster, named Diminishing Risk, which had eight sharks, each with different sizes, sold for $18,600 at the Riversdale Arts exhibition, the highest sale price in the history of the exhibition.

In 2023 two sculptures by Foster named Kotahitanga were placed in Cuba Street in Palmerston North. Each of them are shiny standing humans, one being a man and the other being a woman.

== Personal life ==
As of 2019 Foster's partner is Sabrina Luecht, who works with wildlife.
