= Ka Whata Tu O Rakihouia / Kaikōura Important Bird Area =

Coordinates: 42.3103°S 173.7185°E

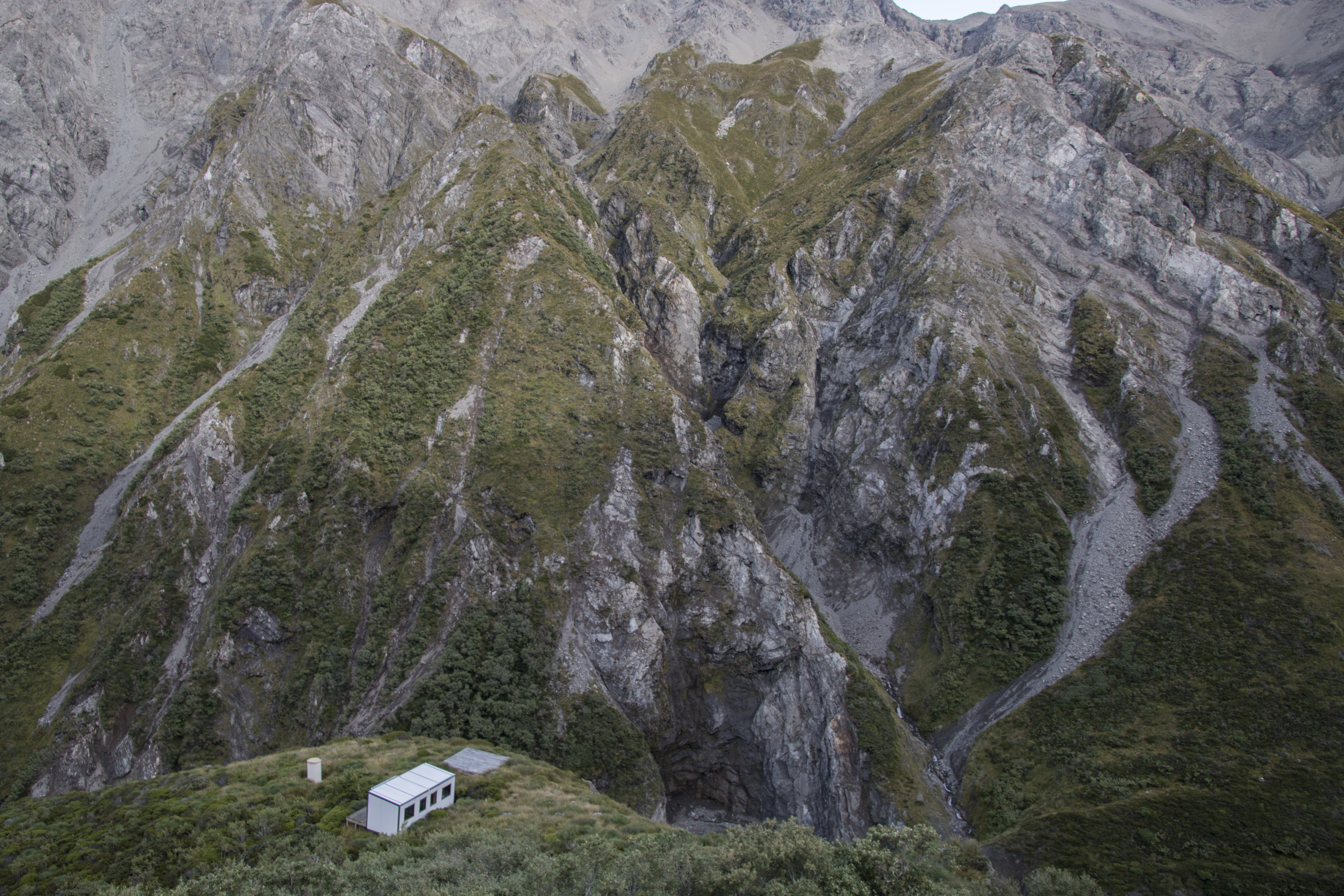
Research hut in the Kowhai colony

The Ka Whata Tu O Rakihouia / Kaikōura Important Bird Area is an area designated by BirdLife International in the Kaikōura region of New Zealand's South Island. The Important Bird Area (IBA) covers 308 km^{2} (119 sq mi) and includes parts of the Kaikōura coastline and the Kaikōura Peninsula. The altitude range is from sea level to 2,596 m (8,517 ft).

Two key sites of the IBA within the Seaward Kaikōura Range contain the entire breeding population of Hutton's shearwaters; about 100,000 pairs in two colonies, some 15 km (9.3 mi) inland from the coastal town of Kaikōura, at an altitude of 1,200–1,800 m (3,900–5,900 ft) above sea level. The larger Kowhai Valley colony, in the headwaters of the Kowhai River in the Uerau Nature Reserve was only discovered in 1964, over 50 years after the species was first described by Gregory Mathews in 1912. The smaller, Shearwater Stream colony is on private land at Puhi Peaks station at the head of the Puhi Puhi Valley.
