= Puhi Peaks =

Farm in New Zealand

Coordinates: 42.18992°S 173.76998°E

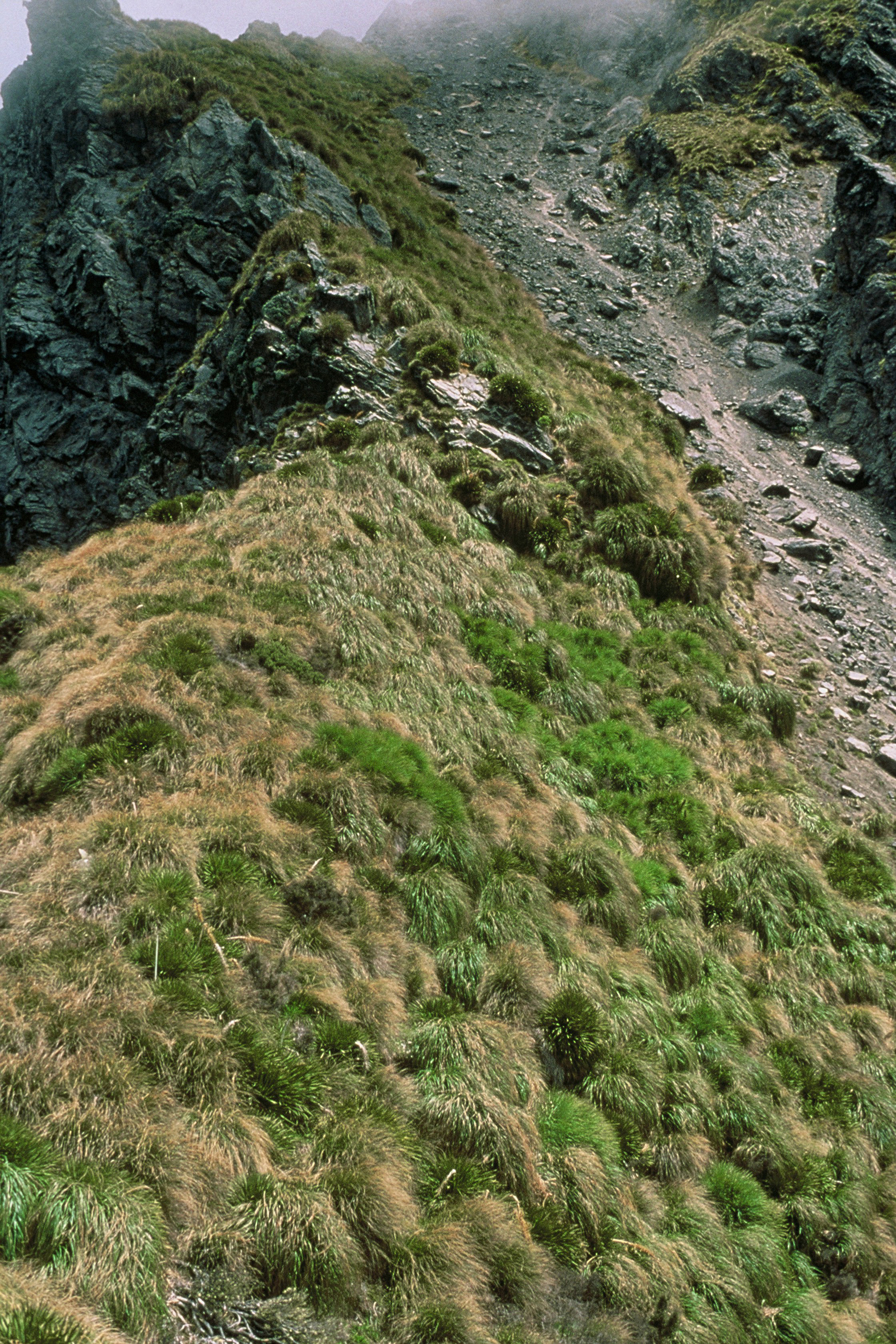
- Shearwater Stream
- Town/City: Kaikōura District
- Country: New Zealand
- Owner: Nicky McArthur
- Area: 1,618 ha (4,000 acres)

Puhi Peaks is a high country station in the Kaikōura District of the South Island of New Zealand. The station is located in the Seaward Kaikōura Ranges and includes the highest elevation privately owned land in New Zealand, with the highest point at 2,438 m (7,999 ft). Road access to the station is through the Puhi Puhi River valley around 20 km (12 mi) north of Kaikōura. The homestead of the station is at an elevation of 610 m (2,000 ft). Nicky McArthur is the owner of Puhi Peaks Station and the owner-operator of the Kaikoura Wilderness Walk operation at the site.

The area of the station is 1,618 ha (4,000 acres), but 810 ha (2,000 acres) has been set aside by the owners in perpetuity as the Puhi Peaks Nature Reserve, under covenant to the Queen Elizabeth II National Trust.

== History ==
A former owner of the Puhi Peaks station, Henry Fairweather, was a regular correspondent for the Kaikoura Star in the years between 1929 and 1942, providing reports of monthly rainfall recordings at the station.

== Hutton's shearwater colony ==
In the mid 1960's, naturalist and mountaineer Geoff Harrow was searching for the nesting locations of Hutton's shearwater. The birds were known in Kaikōura from the regular occurrences of crash-landing in the town during autumn, but the location of their nesting sites was unknown. The first colony to be discovered was in the Kowhai Valley. However, this colony was remote, and access was particularly difficult. Harrow made enquiries of local residents, attempting to find another colony that was more accessible for the purposes of monitoring and research. One of the responses was from Sam Pilbrow of Puhi Peaks Station, who reported that birds would crash into the lights of the homestead on foggy nights between September and March. After several visits to explore the western area of the station, Harrow discovered a breeding colony in steep bluffs. This is now known as the Shearwater Stream colony.

This colony on the Puhi Peaks Station is one of the only two remaining natural breeding colonies of the endangered Hutton's shearwater. This breeding colony, along with flyways the Hutton's shearwater use when travelling between the breeding colony and the coast, is within the Ka Whata Tu o Rakihouia/ Kaikōura Important Bird Area (IBA) of 30,800 ha (76,000 acres) designated by BirdLife International.

== Ecotourism ==
A three-day adventure walk through the Puhi Peaks station was established as an ecotourism operation in 2005. Accommodation for the operation was built at Shearwater Lodge, at an elevation of 1,000 m (3,300 ft). Nicky McArthur became involved in the adventure walk through the station from 2003, including the construction of Shearwater Lodge. She subsequently became the owner of Puhi Peaks Station and the owner-operator of the Kaikoura Wilderness Walk operation in 2008. Shearwater Lodge sustained significant damage in the 2016 Kaikōura earthquake.

The Puhi Peaks station participates in the market for carbon credits, through restoration of the native forest on the property.
