= Manakau (mountain) =

Mountain in Canterbury Region, New Zealand

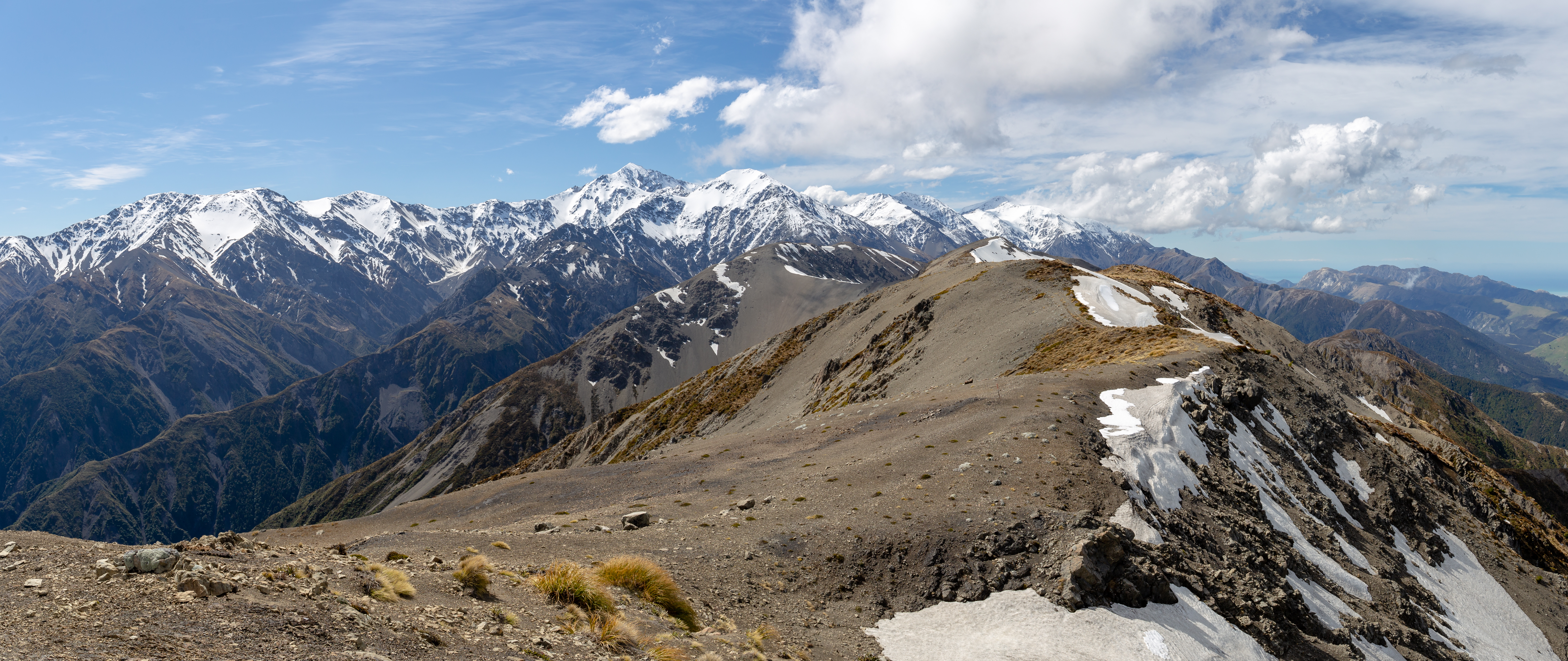
- View from Mt Fyffe towards Manakau

Highest point
- Elevation: 2,608 m (8,556 ft)
- Prominence: 1,798 m (5,899 ft)
- Listing: Ultra; New Zealand #42
- Coordinates: 42°13′30″S 173°37′06″E

Geography
- Location within New Zealand
- Location: Canterbury, South Island, New Zealand
- Parent range: Seaward Kaikōura Range

Manakau is a mountain peak in the Canterbury region of New Zealand's South Island. At 2,608 metres (8,556 ft), it is the highest peak of the Seaward Kaikōura Range.

Five routes to the summit have been described, including the popular one from Barratts Bivvy (however the bivvy itself was destroyed during 2016 Kaikōura earthquake).

Water from the mountain feeds the Waiau Toa / Clarence, Hapuku and Kowhai Rivers.

== See also ==
- List of mountains of New Zealand by height
- List of ultras of Oceania
