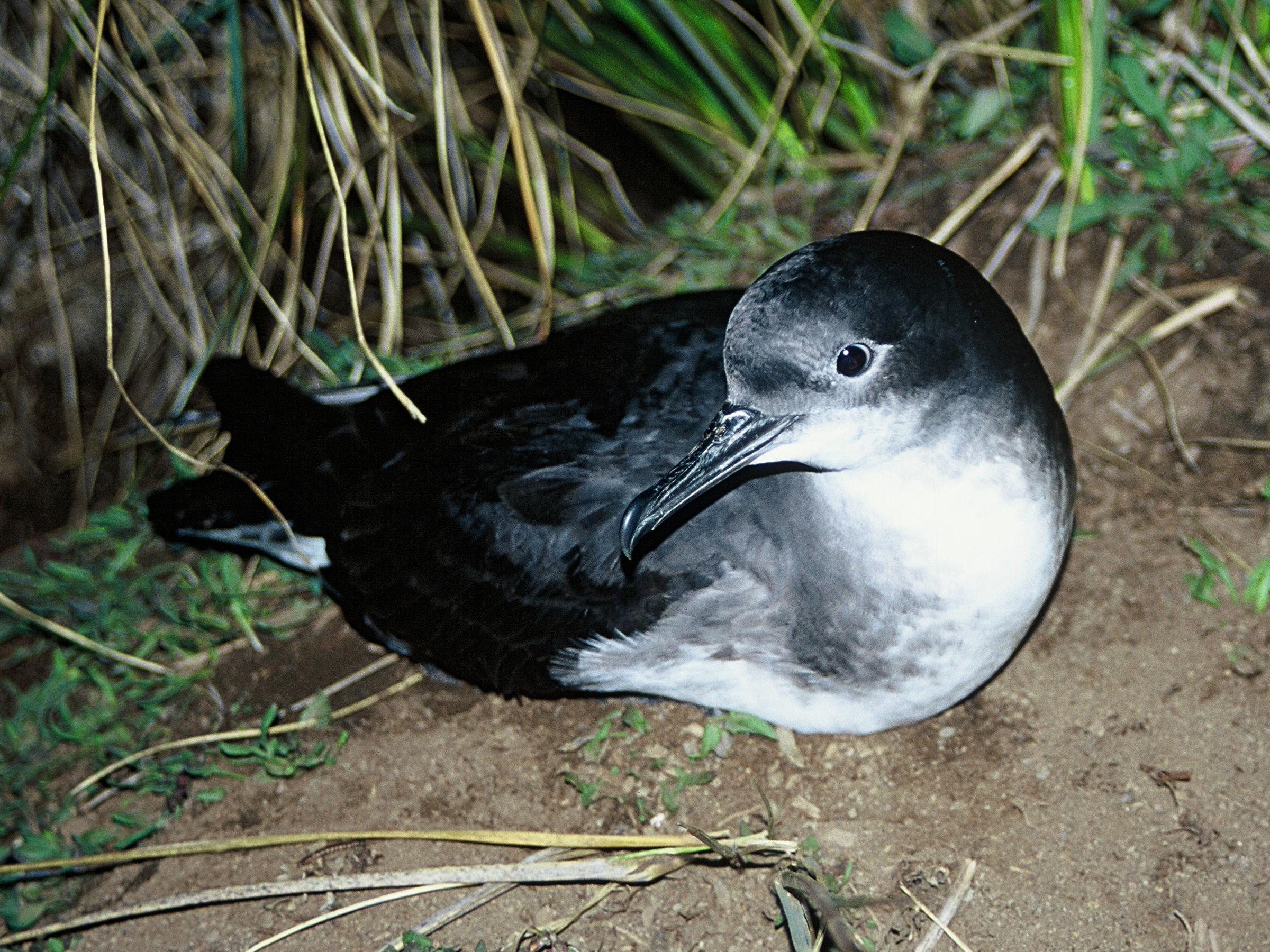

Conservation status
- Endangered (IUCN 3.1)

Scientific classification
- Kingdom: Animalia
- Phylum: Chordata
- Class: Aves
- Order: Procellariiformes
- Family: Procellariidae
- Genus: Puffinus
- Species: P. huttoni

Binomial name
- Puffinus huttoni Mathews, 1912

Audio
- Recording of an individual calling outside a burrow

= Hutton's shearwater =

Species of bird

Hutton's shearwater (Puffinus huttoni; also known in Māori as kaikōura tītī) is a medium-sized ocean-going seabird in the family Procellariidae. Its range is Australian and New Zealand waters, but it breeds only in mainland New Zealand. Its conservation status is Endangered, because there are just two remaining breeding colonies, located in the Seaward Kaikōura Range. Six other shearwater colonies have been destroyed by introduced pigs. Hutton's shearwater is the only seabird in the world that is known to breed in alpine areas. Conservation measures for the bird include predator control at the breeding sites, establishing the Kaikōura Dark Sky Sanctuary, and community initiatives to rescue birds that crash-land at night on streets in Kaikōura. A protected breeding area has also been created on the Kaikōura Peninsula, including a pest-exclusion fence and man-made burrows, with the initial population established by translocating fledglings from the remaining breeding colonies.

== Description ==
The bird's name commemorates Frederick Hutton, a former curator of the Canterbury Museum in Christchurch, New Zealand. A medium-sized (350 g) seabird, with a 75 cm wingspan, it is brown with a white underbelly and brown collar, dark borders to the underwing, dark grey bill, and pinkish dark-webbed feet. It can be distinguished from the fluttering shearwater by its dark grey "armpits". At a breeding colony it has a loud cackling call.

== Ecology ==
Hutton's shearwater feeds in the open ocean largely on small fish and krill, diving up to 20 m. Puffinus huttoni have long bills, which are adapted to catch prey more or less underwater by plunging from a few metres above the surface or by paddling slowly forwards searching with their head submerged, then diving using partly opened wings for propulsion.

== Distribution ==
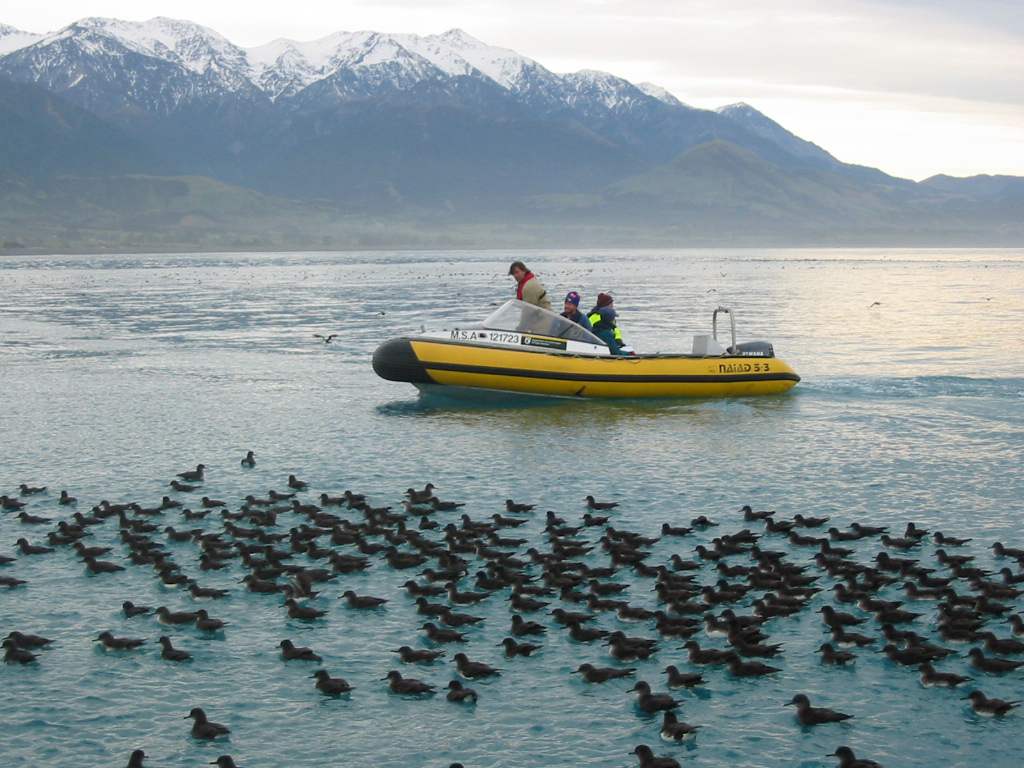
A raft of Hutton's shearwaters feeding off the Kaikōura coast

These birds live entirely at sea except when breeding. During the September–March (spring and summer) breeding season, adults migrate to New Zealand waters. There have been individual sightings around the entire New Zealand coast, but most birds feed off the eastern South Island, especially between Cook Strait and Banks Peninsula. Large flocks can be seen off the Kaikōura coast during summer. Outside the breeding season, they are mostly found in Australian waters. Geo-locators fitted on young birds revealed that some circumnavigate Australia in an anti-clockwise direction in the 4–5 years leading up to sexual maturity.

== Breeding ==
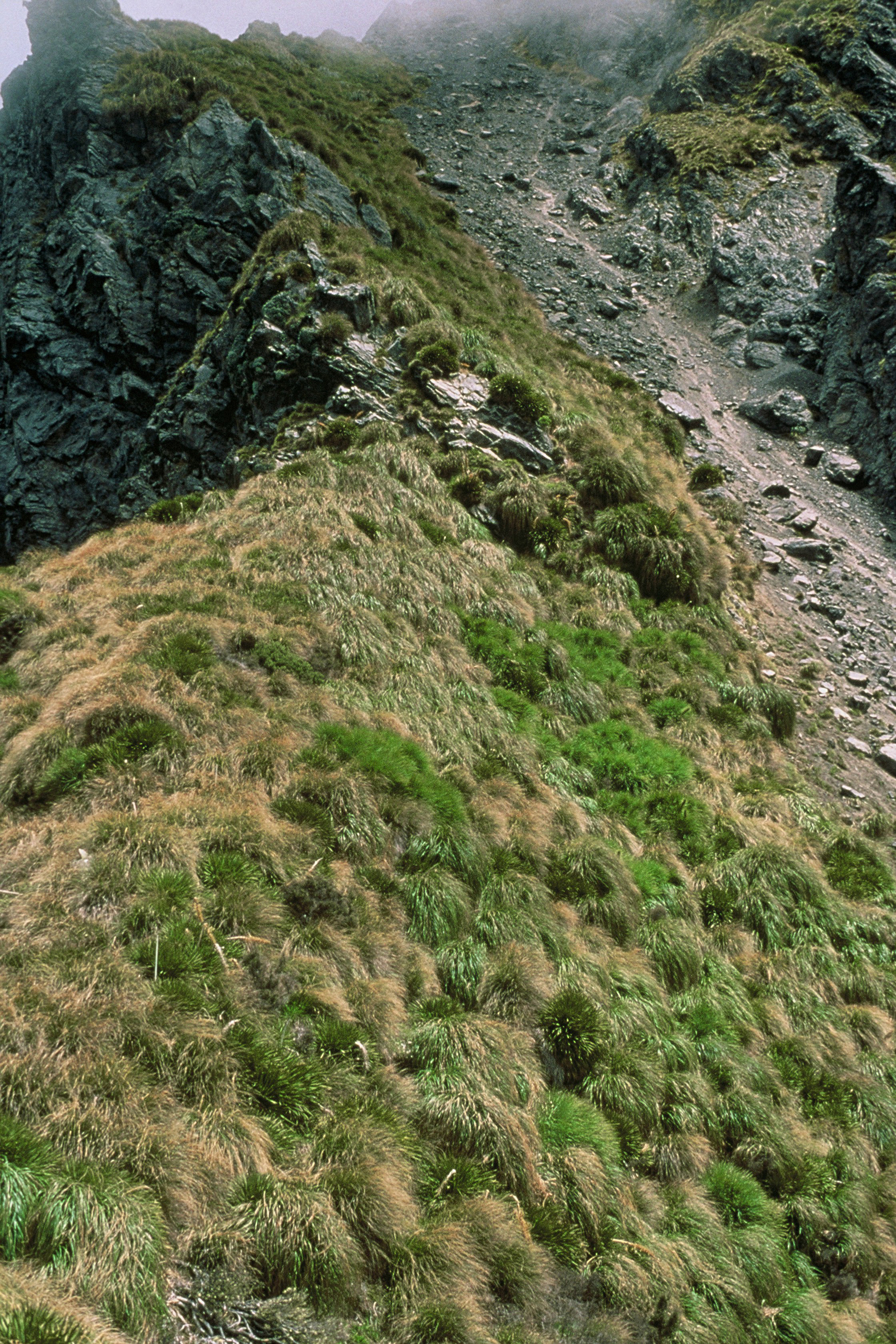
Hutton's shearwater breeding colony, Shearwater Stream, Seaward Kaikōura Range

Uniquely amongst seabirds, Hutton's shearwater breed in sub-alpine to alpine zones, making them one of the few New Zealand seabirds to breed solely on the mainland. Their burrows are at an altitude of 1,200–1,800 m. They formerly bred in both the Seaward and Inland Kaikōura mountains in historic times, and Māori collected the young "muttonbirds" before they could fly for food. Comparing extant and extinct colonies, the key difference is the presence of introduced wild boar. The birds are absent from New Zealand waters outside of the breeding season and adult birds start returning from Australia in late August. Their breeding is restricted to only two remaining colonies in the Seaward Kaikōura Range, one colony of over 100,000 pairs at the head of the Kowhai River, and one small (8,000 pair) colony on private land at Puhi Peaks station, near Shearwater Stream. Intraspecific competition has been observed between male conspecifics as they will defend their burrow from others. Although the species was scientifically described in 1912, its breeding colonies were only rediscovered by Geoff Harrow in 1964. Burrows are dug into steep tussock slopes at a density of 1 per 2 m^{2}. Hutton's shearwaters burrows are simple and non-branching. Kowhai Valley colony burrows are dug on slopes varying from moderate to steep: because the soil here is deeper and friable, shallower slopes are less suitable for burrows.

The most reliable method of measuring breeding success and burrow occupancy is with inspection hatches. Even though this causes a disturbance, the birds can tolerate it well. Over 70% of burrows are occupied by an incubating bird during the early stages of the breeding period. Most breeding pairs will lay one white egg in November which is incubated for 50 days. The responsibility is shared by both sexes; chicks will be fledged in around 80 days. Egg laying within a colony is non-synchronous. Mid-November is the early incubation stage while late incubation occurs in early January. Chick rearing is also from early January and ends in late February. Seasonal variation affects the rate of mass gained by chicks during the fledging period. Annual adult survival has been estimated to be 93.1% with breeding success averaging 46.5% but Puffinus species breeding in introduced predator-free environments have comparable breeding success and adult survival rates. Breeding success in the Kowhai Valley and Shearwater Stream colonies during the 2006/07 and 2007/08 breeding seasons were lower than in the late 1990s even though burrowing occupancy rates were similar. Shearwater Stream breeding success was significantly lower than Kowhai Valley for both of these breeding seasons despite efforts to control stoat population, indicating that predation is not the primary cause of breeding failure. In the case of breeding failure and an unviable egg, a replacement egg will not be laid.

== Feeding ==
=== Foraging strategy ===
Many shearwater species' feeding strategies are an intermediate between pursuit diving and surface feeding. Hutton's shearwater's foraging strategy is exclusively pursuit diving as they dive for prey. On average, birds will dive to a depth of 5.6 m, but they can dive as deep as 35 m. Birds that are incubating will dive deeper than birds that are feeding chicks. When at-sea feeding conditions are poorer, breeding success is lower so there is selective pressure on adult birds to forage adequately.

Individuals have been observed foraging with red-billed gulls, black-backed gulls, white-fronted terns and Hector's dolphins but with varying diving depths and prey preference, niche differentiation may be occurring. Hutton's shearwater will nearly always dive during the day, indicating that vision is a large part of their foraging strategy, with rare night-time dives happening within 72 hours of a full moon. Dives occur as early as 5am and as late as 10pm, while rafting occurs from 10pm until 5 am. Rafting helps to conserve energy when they cannot forage without light. Minimal movement during rafting confirms the birds are not foraging at all, supported by the fact that birds do not raft in the same area as they forage and go to areas with deeper waters than their foraging locations. Diving depth and frequency both vary with time of day and breeding stages with dives being more frequent around dawn and dusk, consistent with the diurnal vertical migration of prey species, but dive frequency between 6pm and 8pm during the chick rearing period is significantly reduced. Less frequent dives at dusk for other seabirds could be to reduce energy expenditure during foraging by allowing potential prey to return to the surface or because birds are returning closer to their colony before foraging as more energy is required to carry resources from a greater distance.

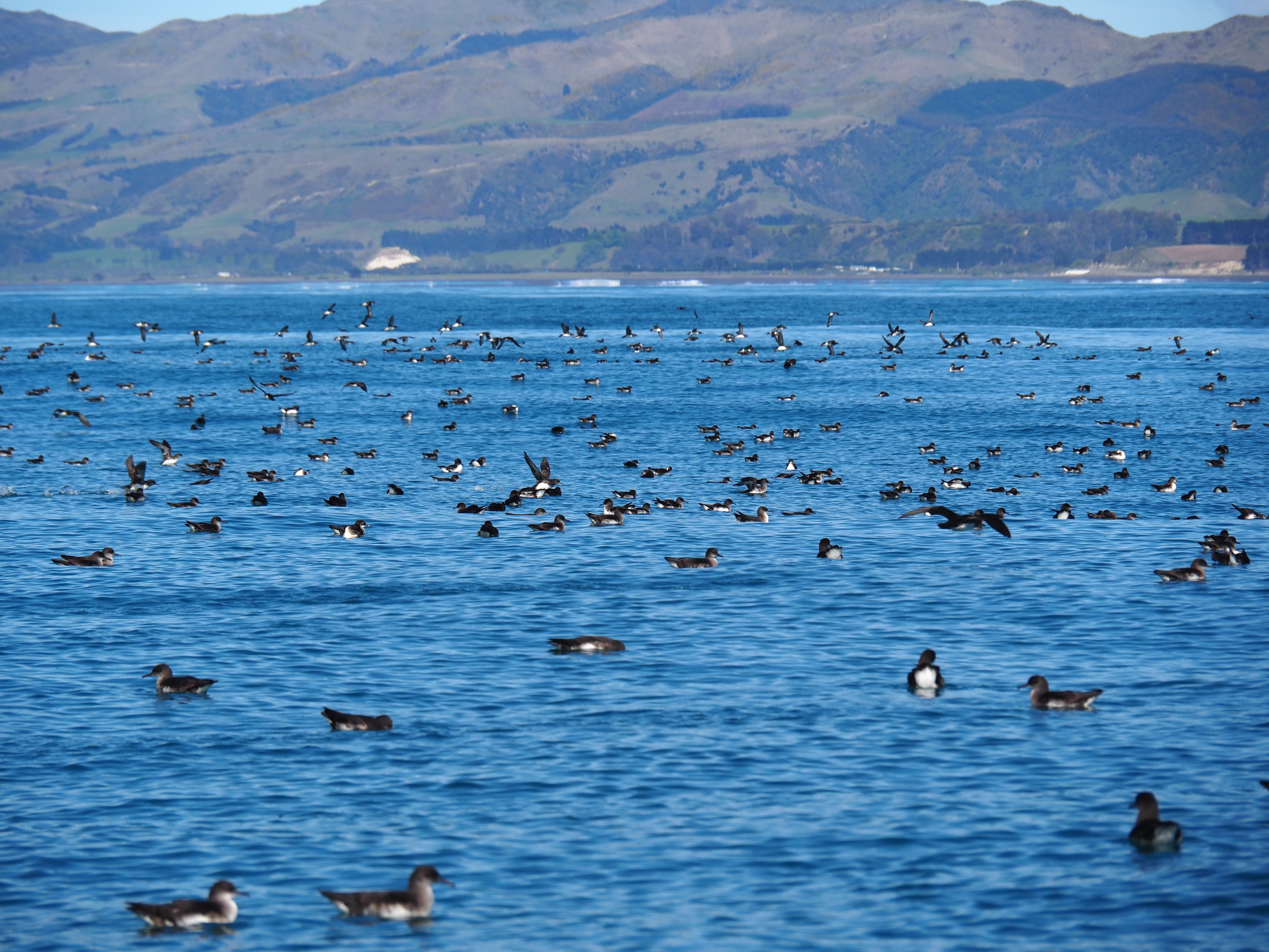
Flock of Hutton's shearwaters rafting south of Kaikōura Peninsula

=== Diet and foraging locations ===
Hutton's shearwater feed on what is available within 50 m of the surface and this can range from small fish to crustaceans, krill and cephalopods. Using GPS trackers on adult birds from the Kaikōura Peninsula colony, four main foraging locations have been identified with two being coastal (Pegasus Bay and Canterbury Bight) and two over oceanic banks (Mernoo Bank and Urry Bank). All the foraging locations were approximately 125-365 km south or south-east of the colony and near Banks Peninsula. Average trip duration and distance is 5 days and 1,092.9 km with the total ranging from 1-15 days and 264-2,157 km. Foraging locations all share the same trait as areas with high chlorophyll-a and waters shallower than non-foraging locations. Using stable isotopic analysis of induced feathers and different prey collection samples from the foraging sites, it was estimated that Hutton's shearwater predominantly feed on small fish, crustacean larvae and cephalopods, with prey diversity being greatest in November. Increased prey diversity correlates with the egg-laying and incubating stage: the birds are less fussy about what they eat at this time so long as they can get food quickly and return to their burrows. Isotope analysis for the composition of induced feathers is more similar to the prey samples collected near Banks Peninsula than samples collected near Kaikōura which suggests the birds are flying and foraging in areas further away from their colony. Few birds may spend the early morning in close proximity to Kaikōura before travelling away. However, during their near-shore movements no dives were recorded, supporting the idea that Hutton's shearwaters do not forage near their colonies.

== Conservation ==
=== Threats to the breeding colonies ===
The eight breeding colonies discovered in 1964 have been reduced to two in separate locations high in the Seaward Kaikōura range at Kowhai Valley and Shearwater Stream; the other lower-altitude colonies were destroyed by feral introduced pigs. The breeding birds' main predators are introduced stoats, which kill about 0.25% of adults and 12% of chicks each year in their nesting burrows. The overall growth rate is still positive though, so stoats are not considered a major threat.

Some parts of the colonies are in steep, unstable sites. The browsing of deer, goats, and pigs in these steep areas has contributed to erosion, which has damaged the Hutton's shearwater burrows and the population. However, control of pigs has led to better vegetation cover at the colonies and lessened destruction of burrows.

The 2016 Kaikōura earthquake occurred during the breeding season and caused landslides in the largest remaining breeding colony at Kowhai Valley. Initial reports indicated a loss of half of the colony. Subsequent work in 2017 indicated the loss was 20-30% of breeding burrows, but that there was a lot of bird activity observed in the nesting areas.

As at 2017, the estimated population size is 600,000 individuals, including 150,000 breeding pairs. Current estimates suggest that earlier studies significantly under-reported the population. However, both of the remaining breeding colonies are vulnerable to predators or erosion.

The main breeding colony in the headwaters of the Kowhai Stream is protected as the Mount Uwerau Nature Reserve. This is a strict nature reserve of 1,102 ha (2,720 acres) within the Ka Whata Tu o Rakihouia Conservation Park where no public access is permitted.

=== Important Bird Area ===
The Ka Whata Tu O Rakihouia / Kaikōura Important Bird Area is an area designated by BirdLife International that covers 308 km^{2} (119 sq mi) and includes the Kaikōura coastline and all of the Kaikōura Peninsula. The altitude range is from sea level to 2,596 m (8,517 ft). Two key sites of the IBA within the Seaward Kaikōura Range contain the entire breeding population of Hutton's shearwaters; about 100,000 pairs in two colonies, some 15 km (9.3 mi) inland from the coastal town of Kaikōura, at an altitude of 1,200–1,800 m (3,900–5,900 ft) above sea level.

=== Crash-landing (fallout) ===
Hutton's shearwaters fly into and out of their breeding colonies in the hours of darkness, and can be disoriented by bright lights at night. This has led to problems with adult and newly-fledged birds crash-landing in the streets of Kaikōura at night. During the season when the fledgling birds leave their mountain burrows, volunteers in Kaikōura patrol the streets, looking for birds that have crash-landed on roads in the town. The young birds are usually unable to take off again, making them vulnerable to being run over by vehicles or succumbing to predation by dogs or cats. In 2015, over two successive nights, there were 200 birds found crash-landed in the town. A new facility, the Hutton's Hub, was opened in 2016 adjacent to the Department of Conservation office, as a place for the community to bring in crash-landed birds. Any birds that can be rescued are taken to a rehabilitation centre for later release at sea. The community volunteer programme results in around 80% of the crash-landed birds being successfully released.

=== Dark Sky Sanctuary ===
A new initiative was launched in 2022 to seek accreditation of a dark-sky preserve in the Kaikōura area. This could reduce the problems that lighting causes for Hutton's shearwaters. The Kaikōura District Council had already modified streetlighting to reduce the risk to the birds. In April 2022, the Mayor of Kaikōura said that the dark sky reserve initiative had the full support of the council, and would be a boost to tourist numbers, especially during the winter period. The Kaikōura Dark Sky Trust applied to DarkSky International for designation as an International Dark Sky Sanctuary in August 2024. The designation was announced on 11 September 2024. The sanctuary covers an area of 2,039 km^{2} (787 sq mi), representing around 98% of the Kaikōura District, excluding Kaikōura township. As part of the implementation of the sanctuary, and to protect the Hutton's shearwater, the New Zealand Transport Agency agreed to change the street lighting on State Highway 1 through the town, using fully-shielded luminaires with colour temperature of 2200K or 2700K. A staged programme of works to replace old lights began in April 2025. The Dark Sky Trust plans to apply for the Kaikōura township to be recognised with International Dark Sky Community status.

=== Artificial colony ===
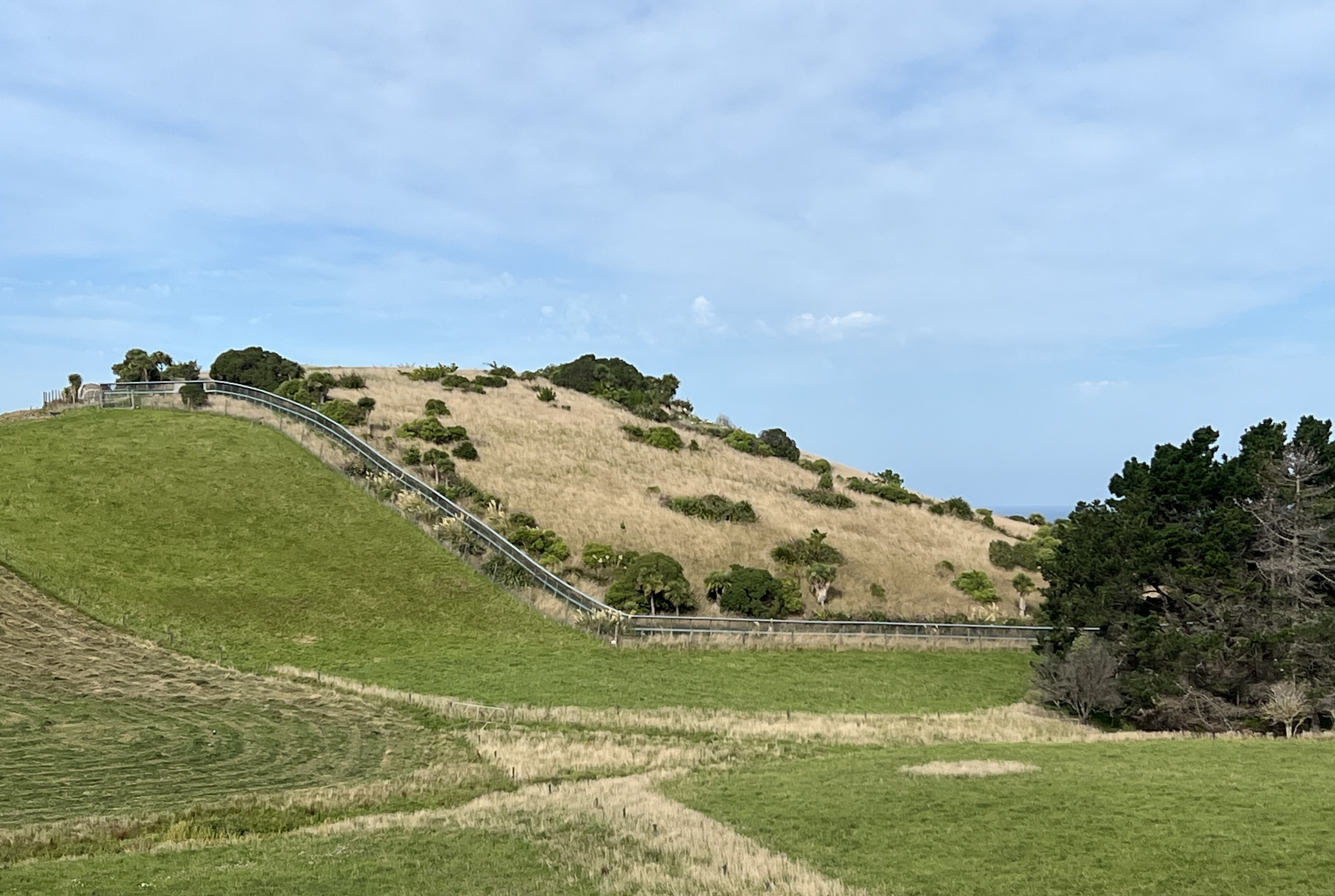
Te Rae o Atiu artificial colony on Kaikōura Peninsula

As a further conservation measure, in 2005 a new colony (Te Rae o Atiu) was established on the Kaikōura Peninsula on a 2.6 ha (6.4 acres) site. First, a small transfer of 10 nestlings was sent in April 2005. After that, roughly 100 additional nestlings were moved annually each March in 2006, 2007, 2008, 2012 and 2013. In the first years, there were heavy losses of chicks because of predation by cats. Chicks translocated from the Kowhai colony were hand-fed in artificial burrows to ensure they would imprint on the new colony, and since 2010 have been returning there to breed. A pest-exclusion fence was built around the site in February 2010 by the Hutton's Shearwater Charitable Trust.

In 2024 there were 27 chicks hatched in the colony, making this the most successful season to date. Regular weighing of the chicks indicated that parents were struggling to bring back sufficient food for the chicks, so supplementary feeding was provided.

== Gallery ==
Puffinus huttoni

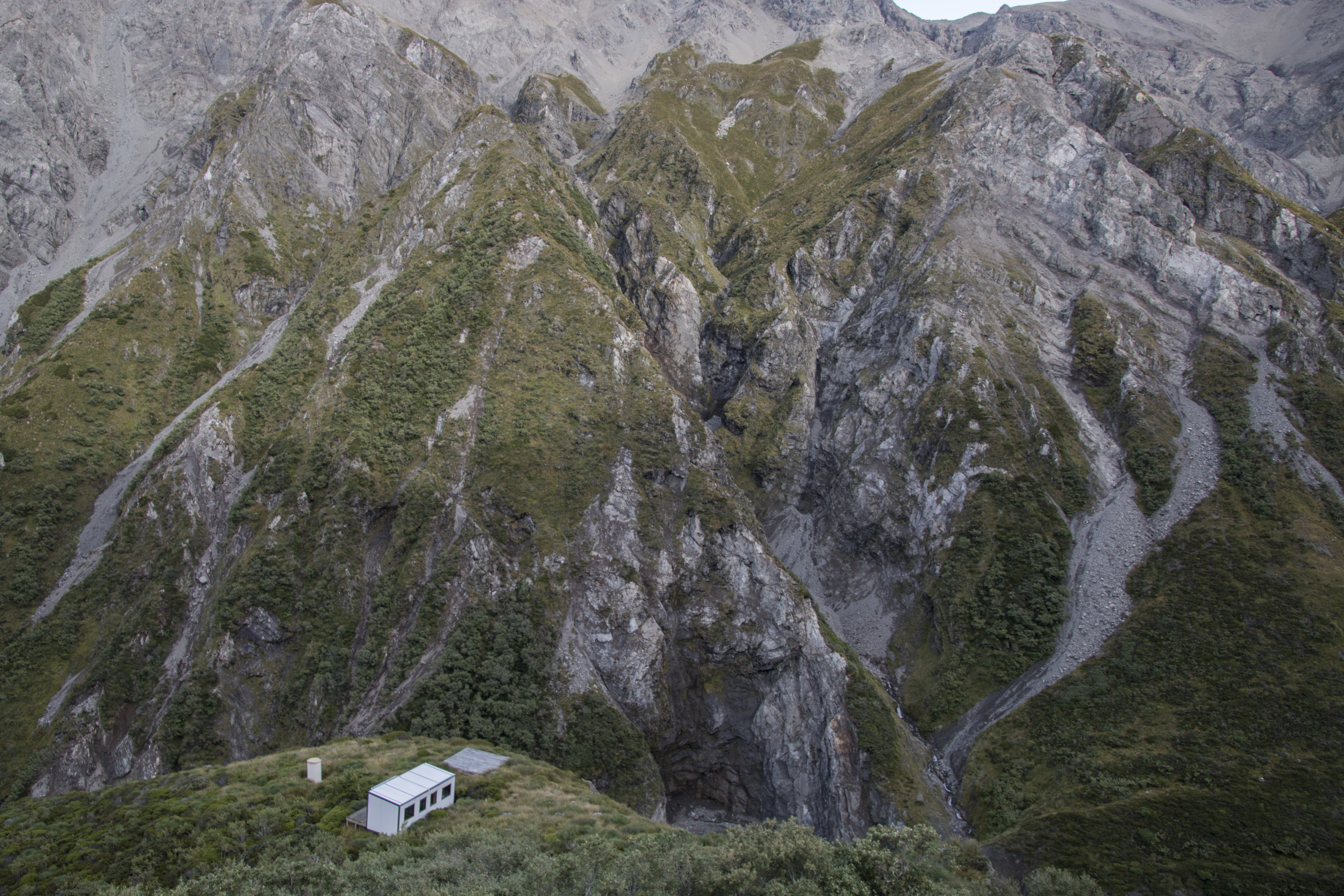
Hutton's Research Hut - Kowhai Colony

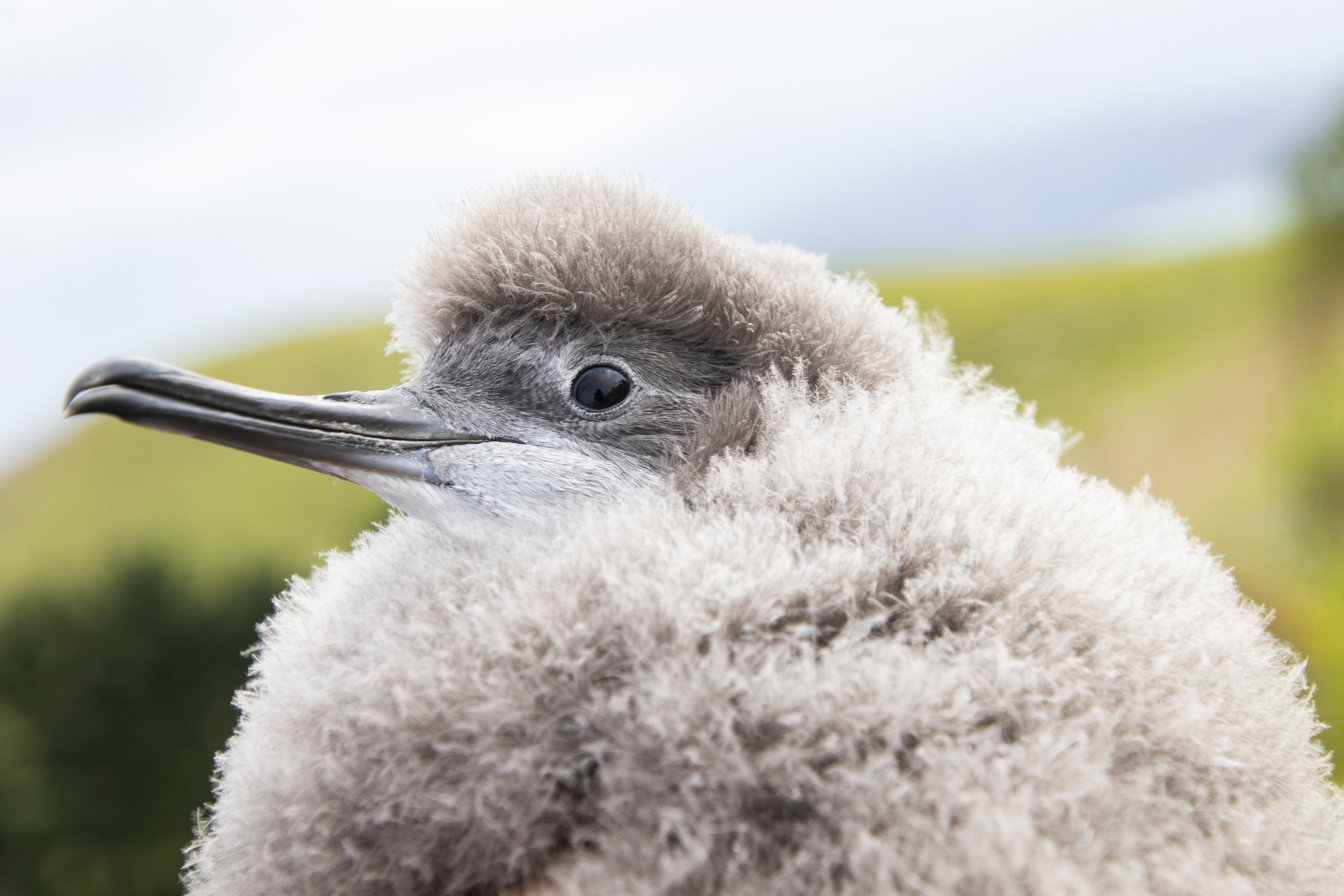
Partly grown chick at Te Rae o Atiu

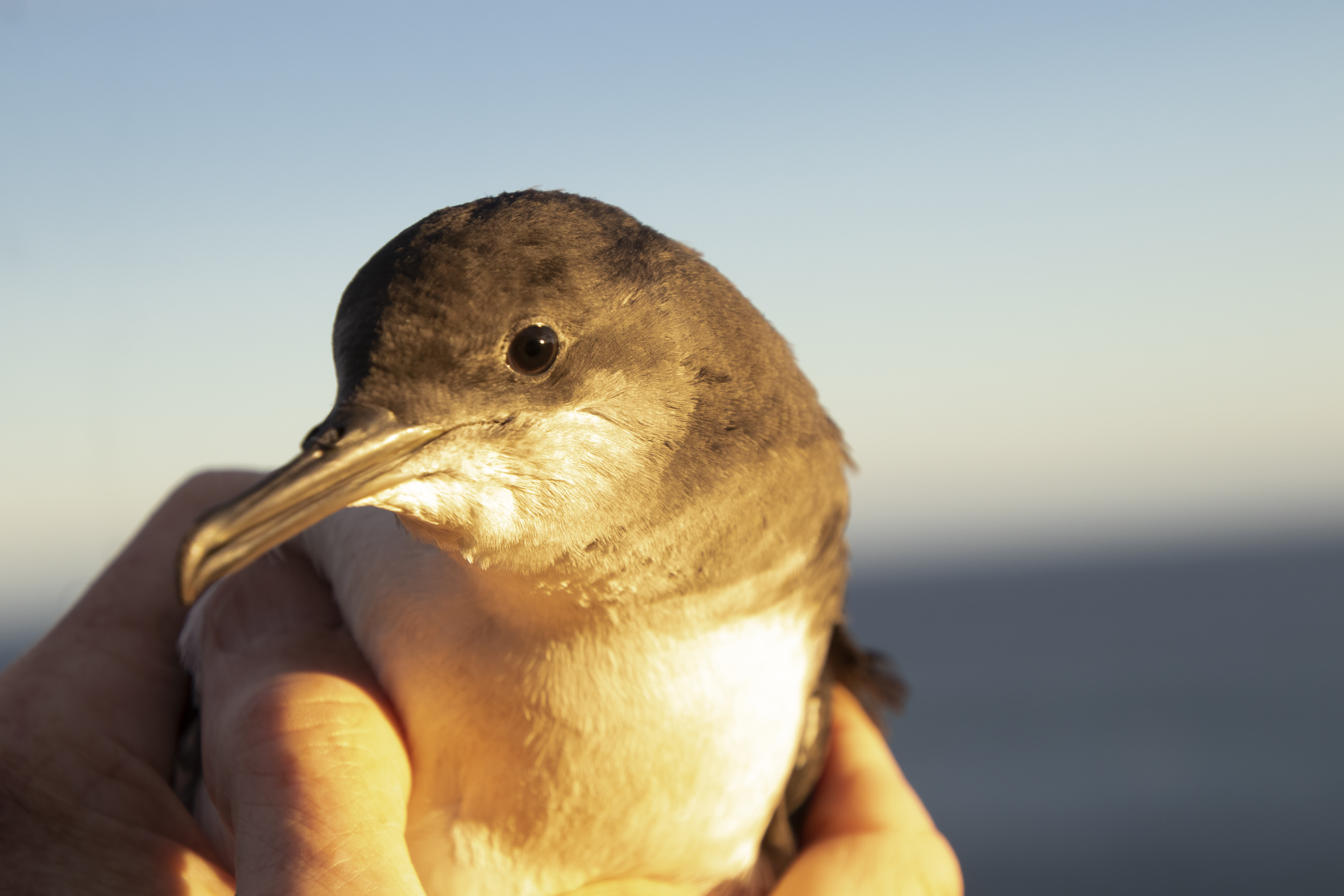
Fully grown chick at Te Rae o Atiu

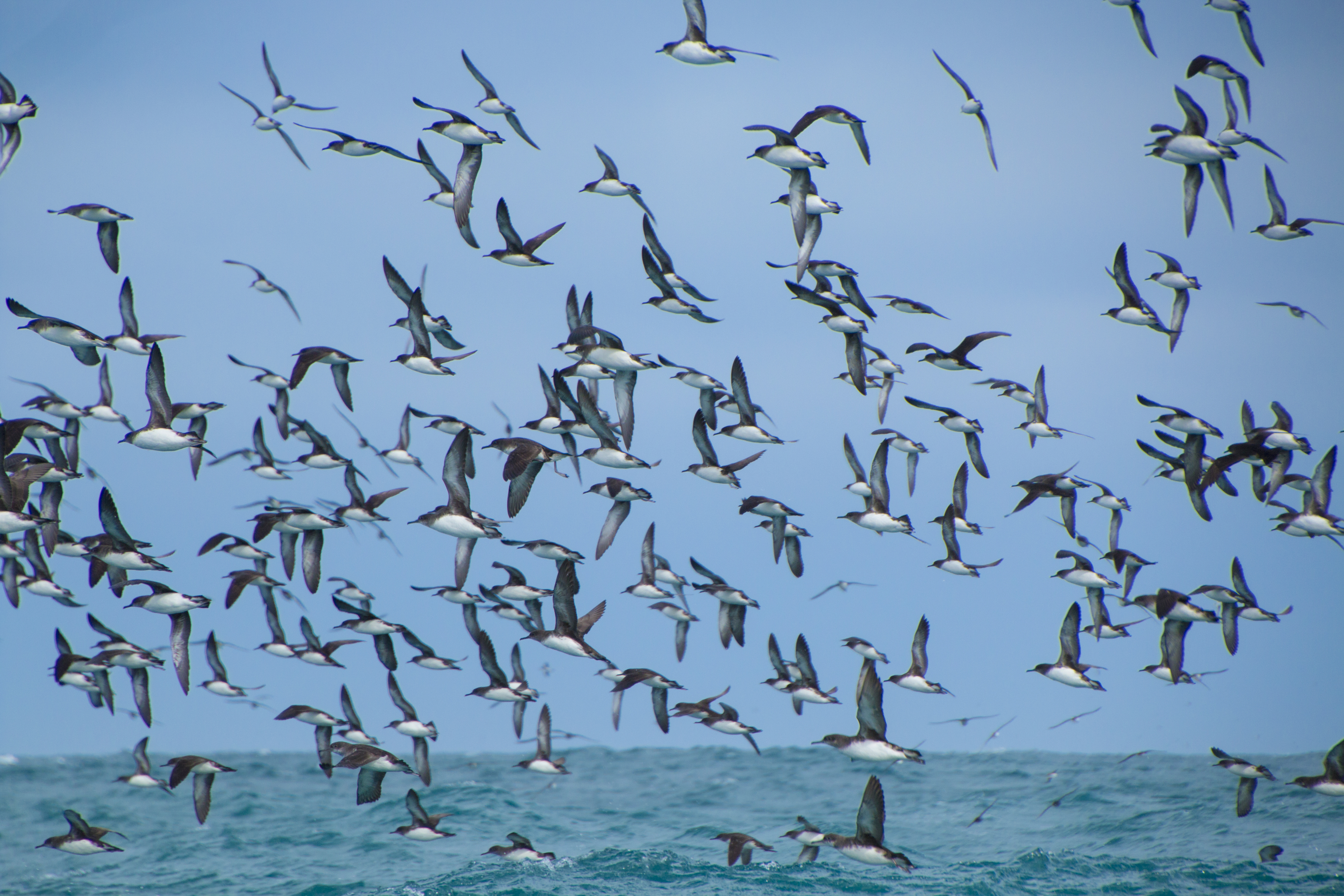
Hutton's at sea

== Bibliography ==
- Cuthbert, Richard J. (2017). Seabirds beyond the Mountain Crest - The history, natural history and conservation of Hutton's shearwater. Dunedin: Otago University Press. ISBN 978-0-947522-64-3.
- Warham, John (1990). The petrels: their ecology and breeding systems. London: A&C Black. ISBN 0-12-735420-4.
