= Kowhai River =

Coordinates: 42.417444°S 173.633562°E

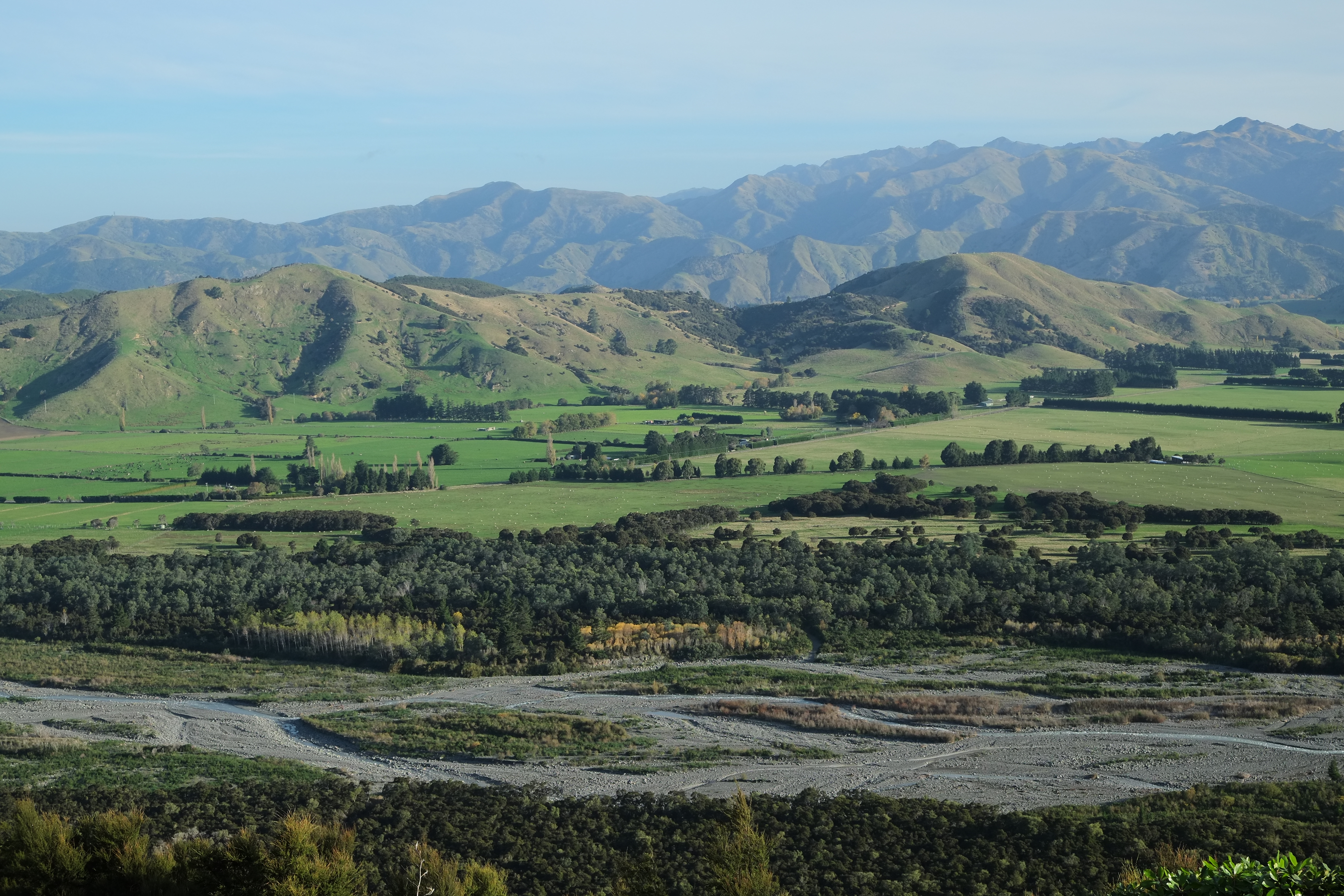
- Kowhai River as seen from Mount Fyffe

Location
- Country: New Zealand

Physical characteristics
- Source
  - location: Seaward Kaikoura Range
- Mouth
  - location: Pacific Ocean
- Length: 26 km (16 mi)

The Kowhai River is a river of the northeast of New Zealand's South Island. It flows south from the slopes of Manakau in the Seaward Kaikōura Range, turning southeast as it reaches its narrow coastal plain. The Kowhai River flows to the ocean to the west of the Kaikōura Peninsula, three kilometres west of the town of Kaikōura.

Regular flooding of the Kowhai and other rivers flowing from the Seaward Kaikouras has built up the floodplain that eventually connected the Kaikōura Peninsula to the mainland. During heavy rain, the Kowhai can become a torrent, carrying 100m³ of water per second, and regularly changes course; over geological time the river has flowed to the ocean both north and south of the peninsula.

In recorded history the Kowhai has flooded the town of Kaikōura every few decades. Deforestation increased the amount of shingle being washed down from the mountains, until the river bed stood higher that the surrounding farmland. The Kaikoura River Board was set up to prevent flooding of the river, which it did through constructing stopbanks and retaining a buffer zone of vegetation along the river, including the 240-hectare (590-acre) Kowhai Bush. In 1967 the Board was abolished and the responsibility for flood control transferred to the Marlborough Catchment Board.

On 23 December 1993 a storm caused the Kowhai to burst through its constructed stopbanks below Kowhai Ford Road, flooding the river flats and the main street of Kaikōura to a depth of 1 metre. A civil defence emergency was declared, and over 60 residents were evacuated. Many homes, businesses and school buildings suffered flood damage.

== See also ==
- List of rivers of New Zealand
