= Kaikōura Peninsula =

Peninsula in New Zealand

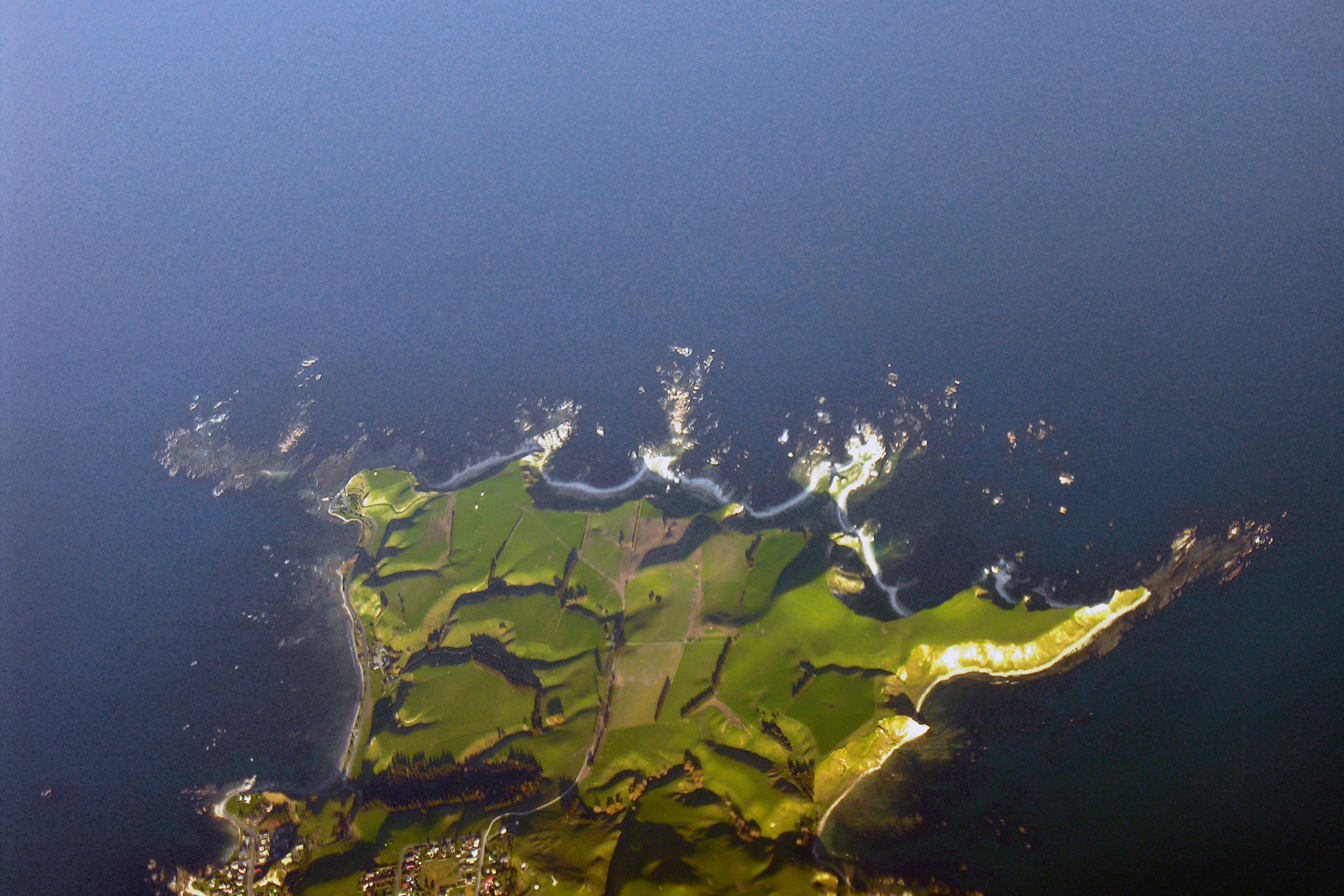
- Aerial view of the Kaikōura Peninsula

Highest point
- Coordinates: 42°25′23″S 173°42′00″E

Geography
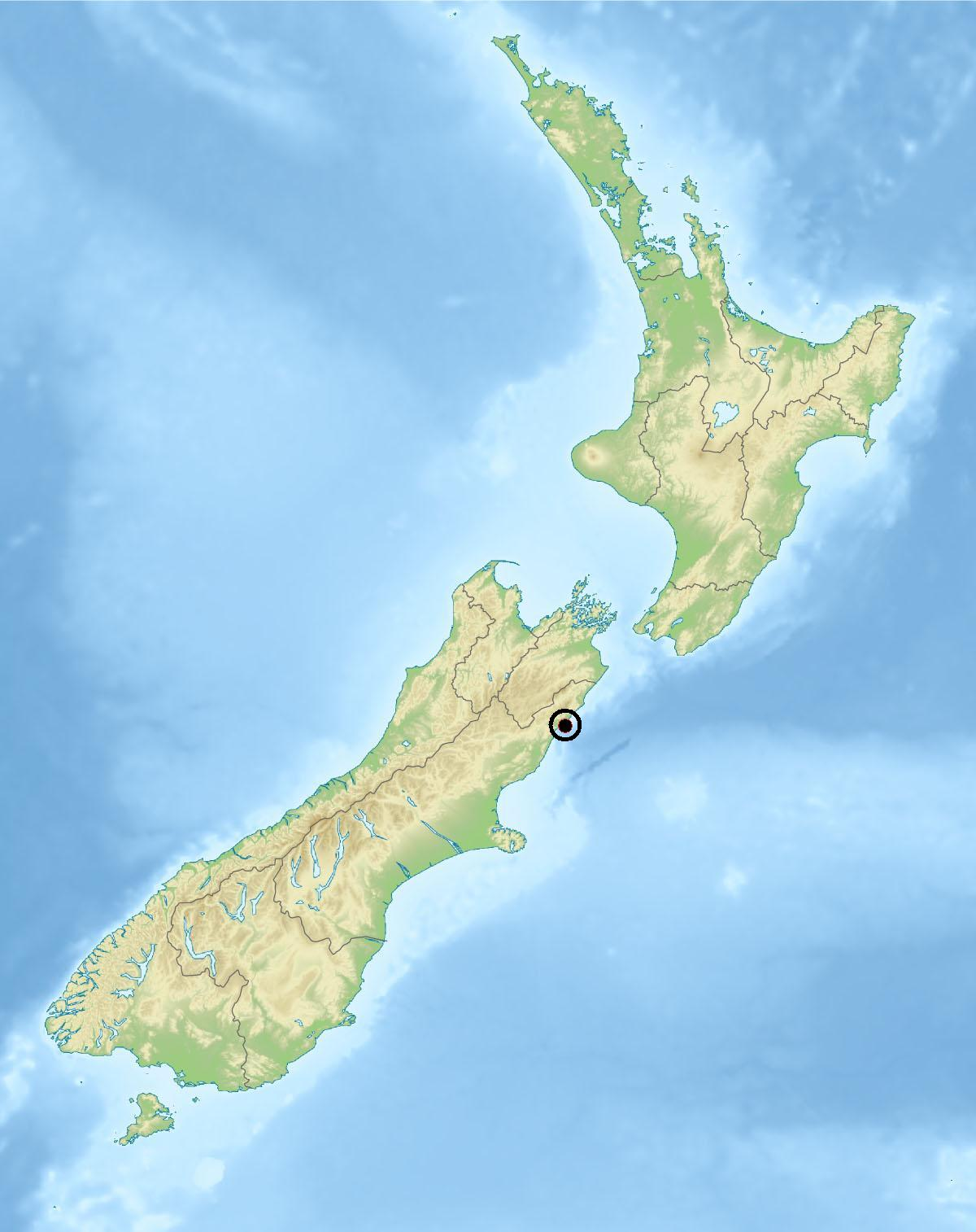
- New Zealand

Geology
- Rock age: Quaternary
- Mountain type(s): Limestone, mudstone

The Kaikōura Peninsula is located on the northeast of New Zealand's South Island. It protrudes 5 kilometres (3.1 mi) into the Pacific Ocean. The town of Kaikōura is located on the north shore of the peninsula. The peninsula has been settled by Māori for approximately 1000 years, and by Europeans since the 19th century, when whaling operations began off the Kaikōura coast. Since the end of whaling in 1922 whales have thrived and the region is now a popular whale watching destination.

The Kaikōura Peninsula is made up of limestone and mudstone which have been deposited, uplifted and deformed throughout the Quaternary. The peninsula is situated in a tectonically active region bounded by the Marlborough Fault System.

== History ==
Māori oral history and tradition describe the demi-god ancestor Māui standing on Kaikōura Peninsula where he 'fished up' or discovered the North Island. An old name for the South Island is Te Waka a Māui (the canoe of Māui), and the name of the North Island is Te Ika a Māui (the fish of Māui). The peninsula has been inhabited by Māori for the best part of 1000 years. They used it as a base for hunting moa, and also harvested the plentiful crayfish which are found along the shore. Strategic positions on the high terraces were fortified and those fortifications can still be seen in lidar imagery of the peninsula.

During the 19th century, European whaling stations were established in the area. In more recent times, the whales that visit the coast off the peninsula have been allowed to thrive, and whale-watching makes the area a popular ecotourism destination. Whales frequent these coastal waters because squid and other deep-sea creatures are brought from the deep Hikurangi Trough to the surface by the combination of currents and steeply sloping seafloor.

== Geology and geomorphology ==
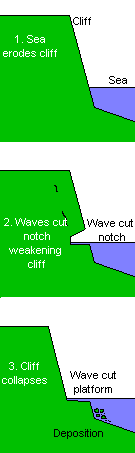
Wave cut platform formation

Kaikōura Peninsula is located on the east coast of the South Island of New Zealand. Formerly an island, it was uplifted from the Pacific Ocean by tectonic processes about 180,000 years ago. At least five further uplift events thousands of years later increased the size of the island, with the lowest terrace being 60,000 years old. Gravel and silt eroded off the Seaward Kaikōura Range by the Kōwhai River and other streams gradually built up a floodplain and connected the island with the mainland, forming a peninsula.

Geologically the peninsula consists of an asymmetrical anticline bounded on either side by two synclines, the axis of which strikes northeast–southwest. The peninsula is made up of two different types of sedimentary rocks, including Amuri limestone of Palaeocene age and Oligocene mudstone. The limestones are Paleocene to Eocene in age, and composed of the calcite skeletons of microscopic plankton and foraminiferans, with chert/flint layers made of the silica skeletons of radiolarians and dinoflagellates. Intense folding and minor faulting have occurred in the layers of limestone. In some spots on the peninsula the limestone has weathered down to form karst sinkholes.

Shore platforms are developed in both lithological units, those in limestone displaying wider variability in morphology. The multi-level terraces were once wave-cut platforms, created at sea level and uplifted out of the sea, at which point the next step would be cut. In the landscape they appear as a flight of terraces, with the oldest appearing at the top, and the youngest at the shoreline where the Kaikōura township is situated. The highest and oldest terrace on the peninsula is 110,000 years old (give or take 20,000 years). Some of the terraces feature sea stacks, conical or chimney-shaped remnants of former hill slopes, shaped by erosion.

The shoreline of the Kaikōura Peninsula is exposed to an extremely long fetch from the Pacific Ocean, and it is also characterised as a high-energy oceanic swell environment, with high-energy storms interrupting long periods of relative calm. High-energy storms due to the passage of cyclonic depressions over New Zealand can occur at any time of the year. The Kaikōura Coast has a mean tidal range of 1.36 m and a maximum of 2.57 m. The region has a temperate climate with moderate rainfall, averaging 865 mm per year and mean monthly temperatures range from 7.7 °C in July to 16.2 °C in January.

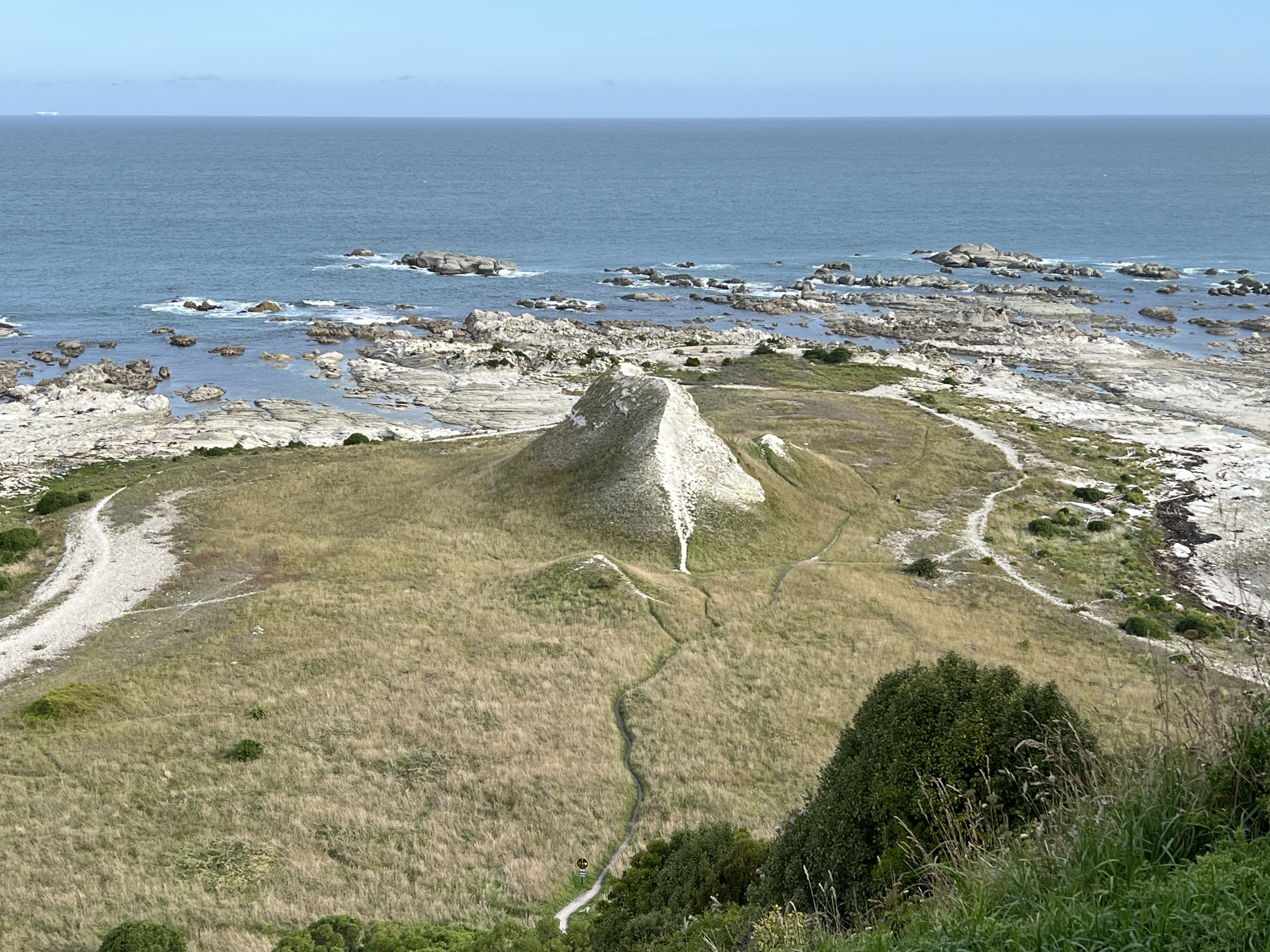
Terrace and sea stack at East Head

The Kaikōura Peninsula environment is subject to highly energetic processes in terms of both marine and weathering processes. Shore platforms are exposed to the dominant wave directions and are in the intertidal zone. Consequently, both marine erosive forces and subaerial weathering processes contribute to erosion. Shore platforms range from 40 m to over 200 m wide and are cut in Tertiary mudstones and limestones. Weathering lowers the platforms by 0.9 mm/year (limestone) to 2 mm/year (mudstone); the highest rate is in rock 1 m above sea level, caused by subaerial weathering from salt crystal growth and wetting/drying cycles rather than wave or storm erosion.

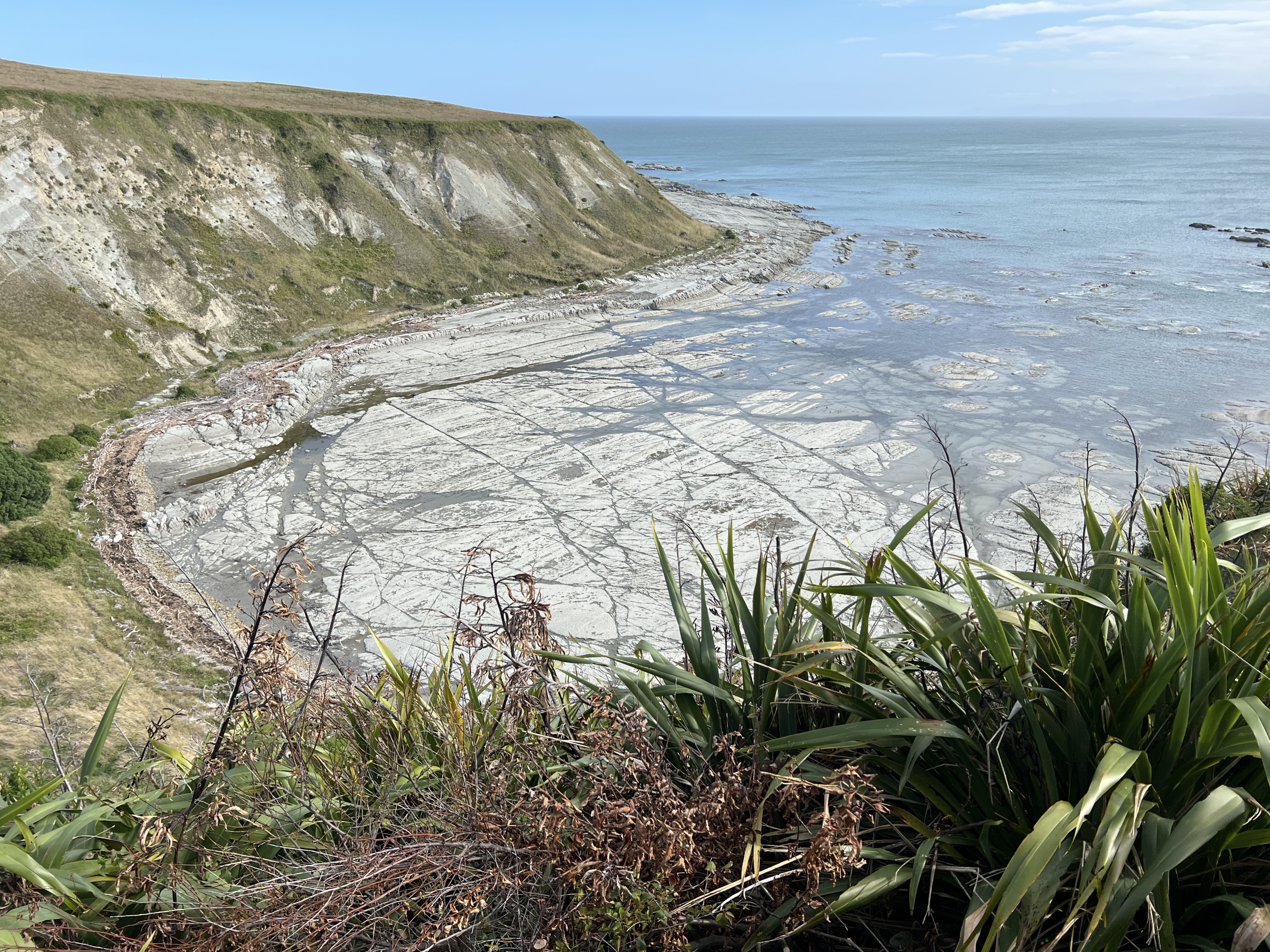
Shore platform at South Bay

Tectonic uplift of the central parts of the peninsula is estimated to be in the order of 100 m (330 ft) during the Quaternary, but the terraces are tilting and so surface uplift is variable. Flights of beaches that fringe the peninsula record a combination of uplift by earthquakes and sea level fall. The most recent uplift occurred during the Kaikōura earthquake of 14 November 2016, and another probably occurred shortly before the arrival of whalers in the area around 1840. The shore platforms are polycyclic and contain inherent morphological features but are being actively rejuvenated by the removal of cover deposits.

Four main phases of tectonic activity are identified for the last 5000–6000 years. These involve changing tectonic-eustatic levels, platform processes and erosional episodes in the hinterland. Consequently, the platforms are rapidly evolving features which reflect both contemporary processes and recent tectonic history.

After the 2016 Kaikōura earthquake uplifted the shoreline, spherical concretions of dolomite (and eroded partial spheres) became visible at low tide at Gooch's Beach and South Beach on the southern side of the peninsula. The largest sphere at South Beach is about 4 m in diameter. The spheres were formed during the Late Cretaceous. The spheres are similar in appearance to the Moeraki Boulders in Otago.

== Important Bird Area ==
The Kaikōura Peninsula is included within the Ka Whata Tu O Rakihouia / Kaikōura Important Bird Area designated by BirdLife International in the Kaikōura region. The Important Bird Area (IBA) covers 308 km^{2} (119 sq mi) and includes parts of the Kaikōura coastline and all of the Kaikōura Peninsula.

=== Hutton's shearwater colony ===
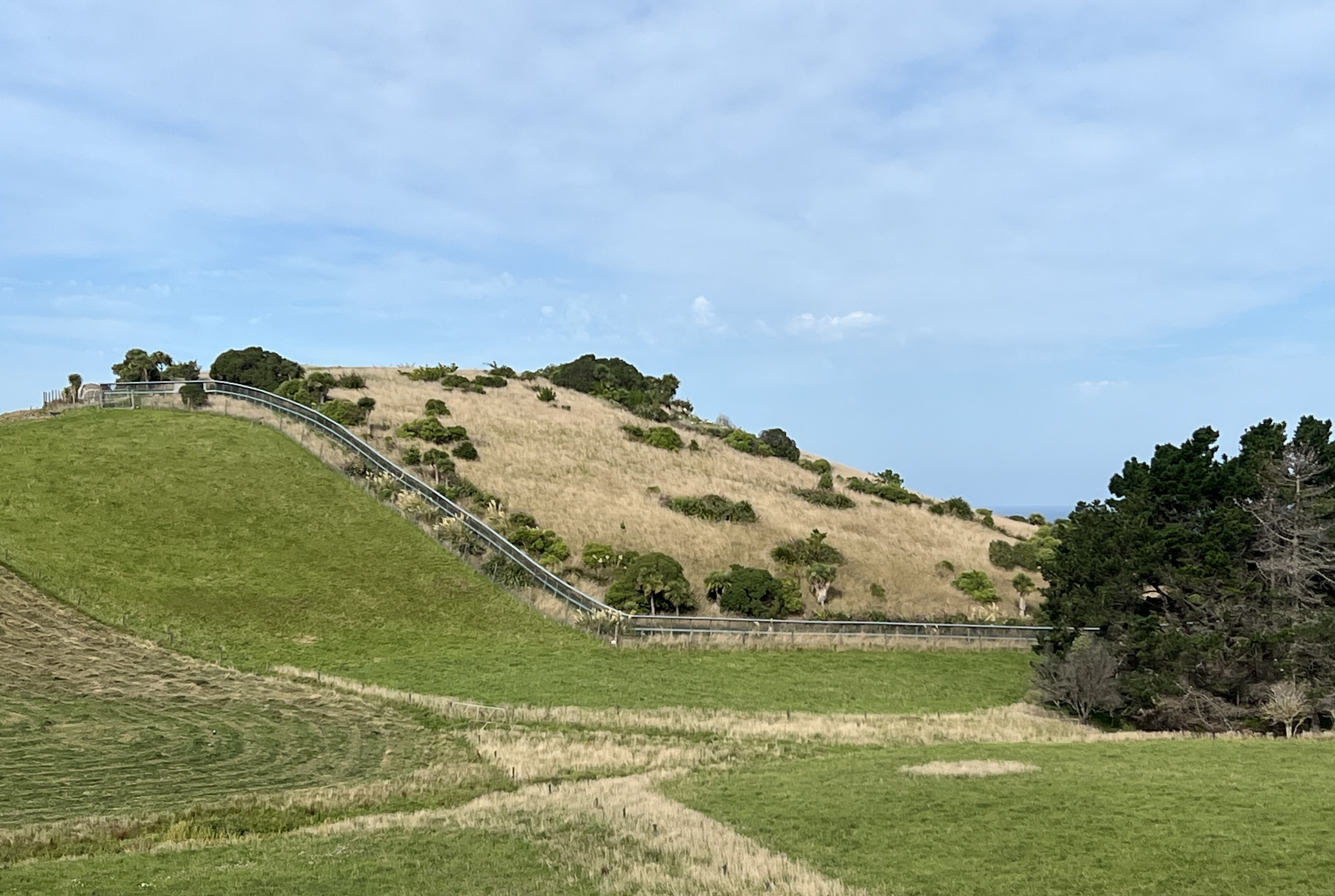
Te Rae o Atiu colony

The endangered bird species Hutton's shearwater is endemic to the Kaikōura region. As a conservation measure for the species, a new breeding colony (Te Rae o Atiu) was established on the Kaikōura Peninsula in 2005. First, a small transfer of 10 nestlings was sent in April 2005. After that, roughly 100 additional nestlings were moved annually each March in 2006, 2007, 2008, 2012 and 2013. In the first years, there were heavy losses of chicks because of predation by cats. Chicks translocated from the Kowhai colony were hand-fed in artificial burrows to ensure they would imprint on the new colony, and since 2010 have been returning there to breed. A pest-exclusion fence was built around the 2 hectares (4.9 acres) site in February 2010 by the Hutton's Shearwater Charitable Trust.

There were 27 chicks hatched in the colony in 2024, making this the most successful season to date. Regular weighing of the chicks indicated that parents were struggling to bring back sufficient food for the chicks, and supplementary feeding was provided.

=== Red-billed gull colony ===
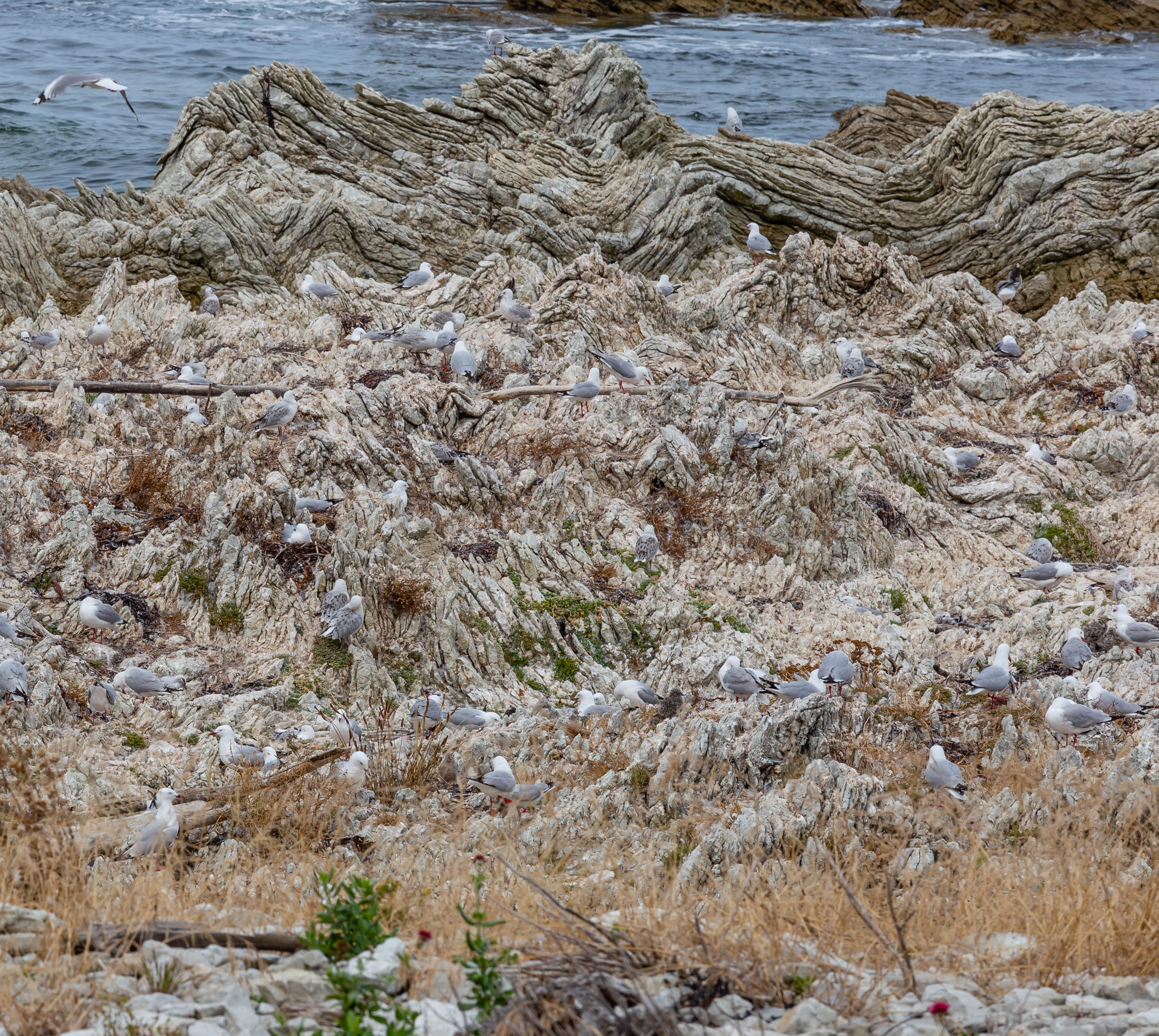
Red-billed gull colony, Kaikōura Peninsula

Kaikōura Peninsula is home to New Zealand's largest breeding colony of red-billed gulls / tarāpunga (Chroicocephalus novaehollandiae scopulinus), with an estimated population of 3210 breeding pairs in 2014–2016. In the 1950s there were two breeding areas at Kaikōura. By the late 1960s this had increased to ten colonies spread out around the north and south of the peninsula, but by the 2000s only two colonies remained. Red-billed gulls typically fly several hundred kilometres between their breeding colony, which they return to each year, and sites where they spend the winter, and most birds stay within 400 km (250 mi)of their breeding colony. However birds tagged at Kaikōura have been found as far away as Invercargill and Auckland. They may travel 20 km (12 mi) or more each day between roosting sites and feeding areas at sea. From 1964 to 2018, Department of Conservation scientist Jim Mills monitored the gulls at Kaikōura during the breeding season from October to January. Over 55 years he counted, weighed, measured and tagged 76,285 birds at the colony, creating comprehensive records that became one of the largest avian databases in the world. Mills found that the population at Kaikōura halved between 1983 and 2003 and the birds became smaller and lighter. Part of the decrease was blamed on predation of chicks by feral cats, and another factor is changes in food sources. Since the 1970s, marine discharge of offal and sewerage has significantly declined, thus removing a winter food source for the gulls. El Niño currents or climate change cause a decrease in krill that the gulls feed on, and malnourished birds are more vulnerable to predators, parasites and infections.

Under the New Zealand Threat Classification System, the status of the red-billed gull changed from 'not threatened' in 2002 to 'nationally vulnerable' in 2016. The red-billed gull is a protected species under the Wildlife Act 1953. Penalties for disturbing or harming the birds include a fine of $100,000 and/or two years' imprisonment.

== Seal colony ==
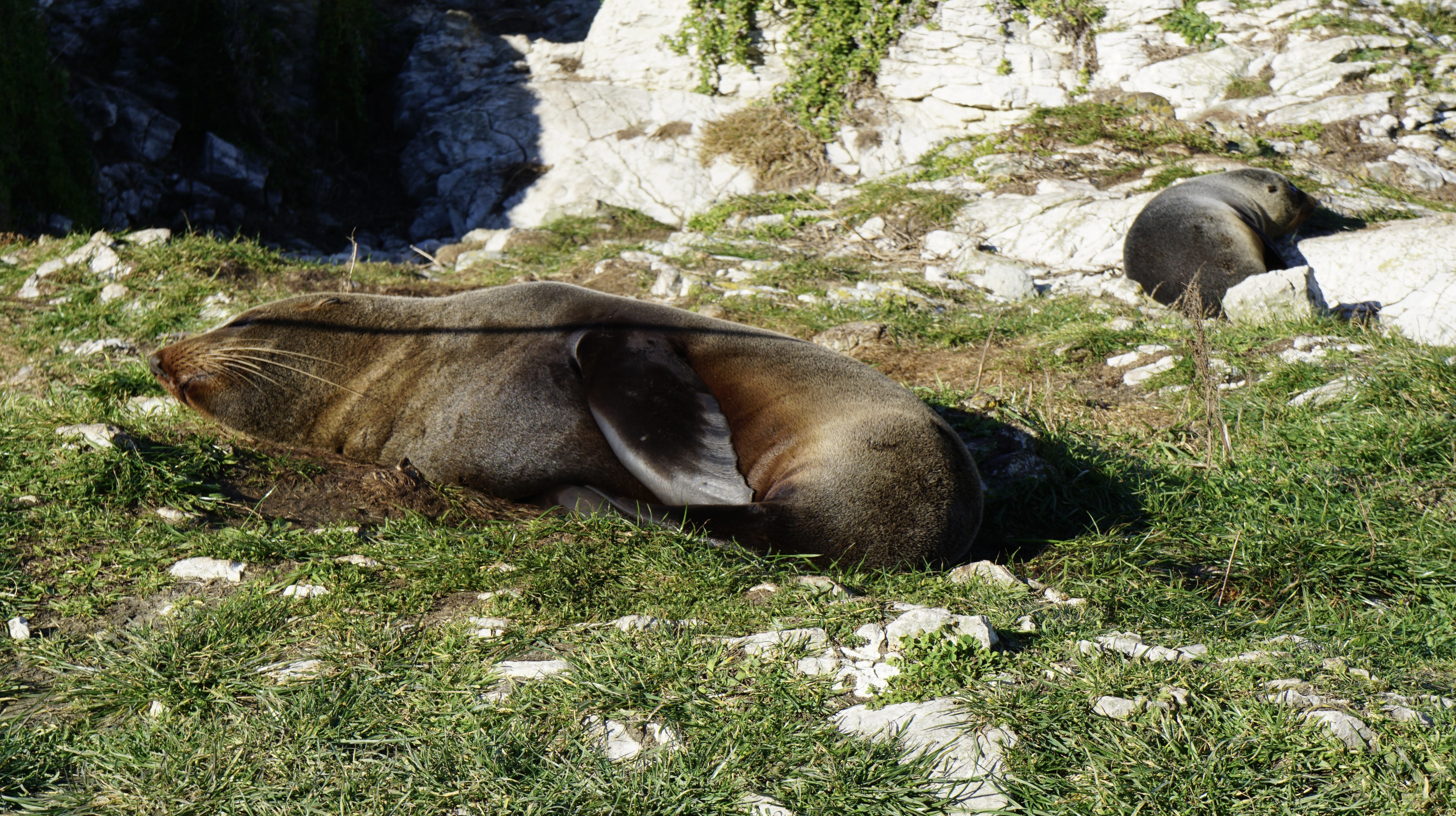
Fur seal (Arctocephalus forsteri) on Kaikōura Peninsula Walkway

The rocky coastal environment of the Kaikōura Peninsula is an ideal habitiat for seal colonies. Large rocks and crevices provide hiding places for pups, and shady areas and rock pools help adult females control their temperature and provide somewhere for pups to learn to swim. There is an ample supply of food (octopus, squid and fish) in the deep water close to shore. In 1956 there was a marked influx of non-breeding New Zealand fur seals (Arctocephalus forsteri) to Kaikōura, but numbers declined in the 1960s–1970s. Another increase came in the early 1990s when seals re-established colonies at Kaikōura Peninsula and began breeding there and further along the coast at Ohau Point to the north and Barney's Rock to the south of the peninsula. It is estimated that 2000 seals live at Kaikōura; the seal population has increased in recent years due to conservation efforts such as habitat protection and minimising human impacts. As of 2024, there were several fur seal breeding sub-colonies and smaller non-breeding colonies along the east coast of the Kaikoura Peninsula between Point Kean and Whalers Bay, and also at Lynch's Reef, just off the peninsula. Males come ashore during October and November to establish territories before females arrive to give birth and suckle their pups before mating again. The number of seals on shore decreases in January and February at the end of the breeding season, and increases during the winter months. In 2003 the Kaikōura Peninsula fur seal colony was the third most-visited site in New Zealand, with over 100,000 tourists per year. Visitors can view the seals from the Kaikōura Peninsula walkway along the top of the bluff, or take a tour by boat.

== Kaikōura Peninsula Walkway ==
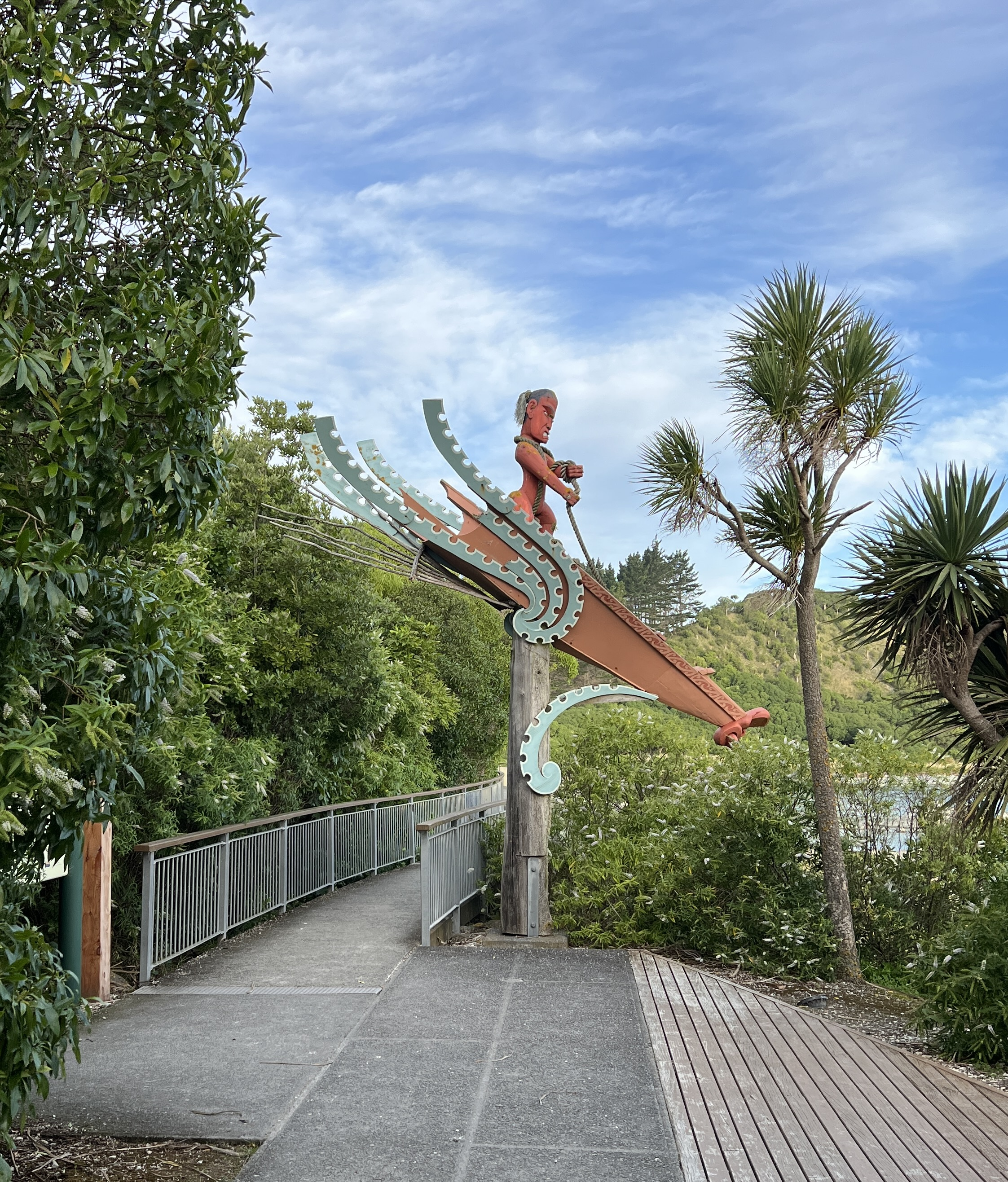
South Bay end of walkway

The Kaikōura Peninsula Walkway Committee was set up in 2002 to develop the walkway as a collaborative community project involving Whale Watch Kaikōura, Te Runanga o Kaikōura, the Kaikōura District Council and the Department of Conservation, and by 2012, 55,000 people were walking the track each year.

The Kaikōura Peninsula Walkway is an 11.7 km-long walkway around the clifftops of the peninsula. The whole walk takes about three hours to complete, but it can be walked in sections. Beginning at Kaikōura, the walkway passes along the Esplanade to a lookout at Point Kean, from where one can see seals and tidal platforms frequented by many types of seabird. The walkway then passes along the clifftops of the peninsula, with side trips down to the shoreline, before looping back to Kaikōura town centre. It is also possible to descend to the coastline and, when tides permit, walk along coastal platforms and beaches to the end of the walkway at South Bay. Information panels along the route describe the history, landscapes and wildlife of the area.
