= St John's Church, Dalton =

Church in Dalton, North Yorkshire, England

Coordinates: 54.1808°N 1.3341°W

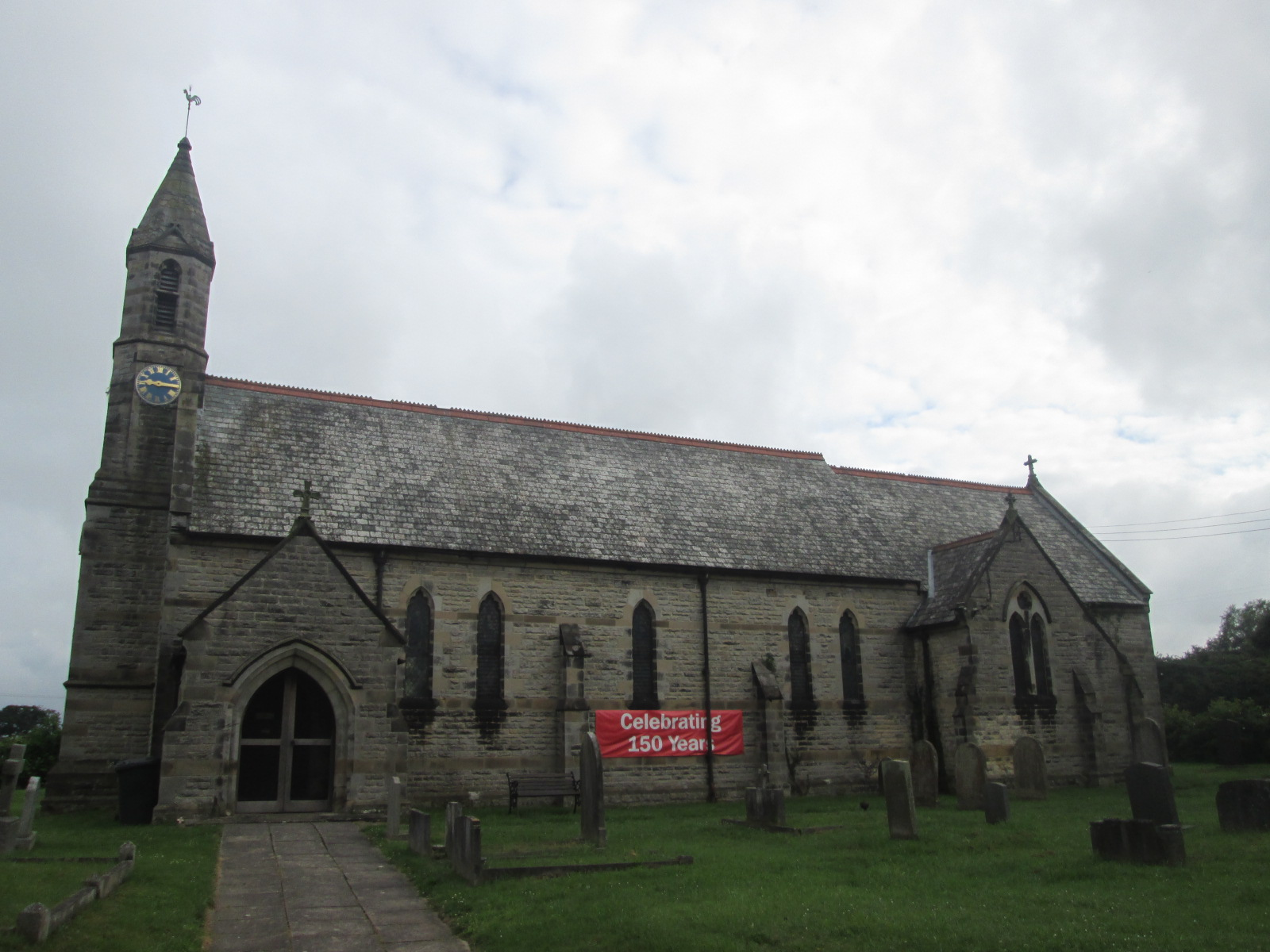
The church, in 2019

St John's Church is an Anglican church in Dalton, near Thirsk in North Yorkshire, in England.

The church was constructed on the initiative of Mary Isabel Dawnay, to a design by William Butterfield, and was completed in 1868. It was originally a chapel of ease to St Columba's Church, Topcliffe. It was grade II* listed in 1988.

The church is built of stone with a Welsh slate roof, and it consists of a nave with a south porch, a chancel with a south transept and a north vestry, and a slim west bellcote tower. The tower contains a lancet window with a hood mould, and a sill band. The upper stage, which is corbelled inwards, has a clock face, and it rises to become octagonal with four lancet bell openings. Above this is an eaves band and a spirelet. The windows in the body of the church are cusped lancets.

Inside the church, there is red brick, with bands of stone and blue brick. There is much polychromatic decoration, particularly in the chancel. There is a timber rood screen, and a reredos of marble and coloured stone. There is a brass chandelier in the chancel, and a stone font in the nave, both designed by Butterfield. The stained glass is by Morris & Co., with Saint John the Evangelist in the west window, Christ and angels in the east window, and the Annunication in the north window of the chancel.

== See also ==
- Grade II* listed churches in North Yorkshire (district)
- Listed buildings in Dalton, east North Yorkshire
