= Joseph Tetley =

New Zealand politician and fraudster

The Honourable Joseph Tetley
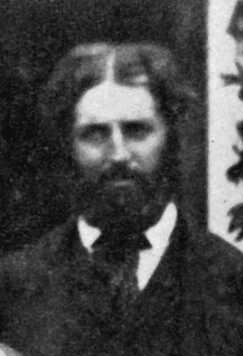
- Tetley in the 1860s

Member of the Legislative Council
- In office 8 July 1867 – 19 June 1869
- Appointed by: Edward Stafford

Marlborough Provincial Councillor
- In office 5 January 1867 – 13 January 1869
- Constituency: Picton electorate

Personal details
- Born: Joseph Dresser Tetley; 28 November 1825 Topcliffe, Yorkshire, United Kingdom
- Died: 21 August 1878 (aged 52) Nueva Helvecia, Uruguay
- Spouse: Elizabeth Dodsworth (m. 1849, died 1867)
- Occupation: Farmer, politician, fraudster

Joseph Dresser Tetley (28 November 1825 – 21 August 1878) was an English-born New Zealand land owner, sheep farmer, and politician. He was a member of the Marlborough Provincial Council and the New Zealand Legislative Council, both from 1867 to 1869. Tetley arrived in New Zealand after obtaining useful connections there through his wife. He eventually fled from New Zealand, having deceived various investors who lost a combined NZ$7 million converted to today's value. The resulting scandal was discussed in the media and the courts for the following two years, though Tetley himself was never charged, as he had disappeared to South America.

== Early life ==
Tetley was born in Kilgram near Rookwith in North Yorkshire, England, on 28 November 1825. His family was from Clervaux, at Croft, in Yorkshire, though he was born a little further south, in Dishforth, within the parish of Topcliffe.

Tetley was a tenant farmer. He met Elizabeth Dodsworth, whose family lived in Thornton Watlass, a village nearby. She was the daughter of Sir Charles Dodsworth, 3rd Baronet, and subsequently married her on 15 February 1849. They had three sons: Willy (born 1851), Cadwallader (1854–1913), and Frank (born 1856).

Through his wife, Tetley was able to establish connections with the gentry, and was invited to a party around 1856, where he met Frederick Weld. Following this meeting, and reading Weld's pamphlet on Hints to Intending Sheep Farmers in New Zealand, he departed for New Zealand. His departure happened prior to November 1857, when a bankruptcy petition was opened against him in the Leeds Bankruptcy Court. Tetley arrived in New Zealand on the Marchioness, which sailed into Wellington Harbour on 27 November 1857. His wife arrived with their three sons on the Westminster in Lyttelton on 9 January 1858.

== Farming and politics ==
Upon his arrival in New Zealand, thanks to his connections with Weld, Tetley was able to meet with Nathaniel Levin, a businessman in Wellington. He became a sheep farmer in Marlborough, on the Kekerengu River, from 1857 or 1858, establishing the sheep station of Kerekengu Station. He obtained this land with the assistance of some financial backing from Levin. He also had an interest in Starborough, near Seddon.

Tetley represented the Picton electorate on the Marlborough Provincial Council from 5 January 1867 to 13 January 1869. In July 1867, Tetley was—alongside John Hyde Harris—appointed to the Legislative Council. He was a member of the upper house from 8 July 1867 to 19 June 1869. He resigned from the Legislative Council after his departure from New Zealand, in 1869.

== Fraud, departure from New Zealand, and aftermath ==
During his time in New Zealand, Tetley had obtained thousands of pounds worth of investments from several creditors, including Nathaniel Levin and Richard Beaumont (one of four young men from England from whom Tetley had also secured investments). (Note: The other investors were Digby Garforth, Henry Wharton and Frederick Dull; however, the majority of the investments came from Beaumont.) In 1867, his wife and her servant (Mrs Gale) left for England via Panama. The plan had been for Tetley to follow them later, and for the three to return to New Zealand together. The two women both died of yellow fever in November 1867 (Note: The source says that the first cases of yellow fever occurred on 15 November, and that the last of the seven deaths on board the SS Tamar occurred on 20 November 1867.) during the passage near the West Indies. It was reported that she survived the 18 November 1867 Virgin Islands earthquake and tsunami. Tetley's wife was buried at sea, with a headstone erected for her in a cemetery in Yorkshire.

In mid-February 1868, Tetley, Arthur Seymour, the land purchase agent J. Young, and the interpreter Abraham Warbrick travelled from Tauranga to the country's interior at Taupō to purchase or lease land from Māori. Later that year, it was reported that Seymour and Tetley had secured 100,000 acres (40,000 ha) and 400,000 acres (160,000 ha), respectively, with Tetley's land on the banks of the Waikato River where it flows into Lake Taupō. It turned out, however, that the arrangements had not been finalised and neither had obtained legal access to the land.

Tetley left New Zealand on 8 May 1868 on the Mataura from Wellington Harbour for Southampton via Panama, with the stated intention of returning immediately. On 16 January 1869, the Marlborough Express reported that Tetley had resigned from the Marlborough Provincial Council. His resignation from the Legislative Council was accepted on 19 June 1869, over a year after his departure. He never returned to New Zealand.

While Tetley was away, Richard Beaumont assessed his financial situation – and came to the realisation that Tetley had deceived him and his fellow investors. Tetley was in thousands of pounds of debt, did not leave any money behind to cover the continued costs of running his properties, and had used the investments as a means of boosting his own finances in order to obtain several large unsecured loans – thereby dashing all hopes of his investors gaining a return on their investments. Converted to 2017 value, Tetley defrauded various investors by NZ$7 million.

Beaumont blamed Nathaniel Levin (who had also been deceived out of thousands of pounds by Tetley), asserting that Levin had been complicit in Tetley's fraud. Levin, who had since been appointed to the Legislative Council himself, sued Beaumont for defamation, and the case was heavily publicised. The trial was held in Nelson, started in November 1869, and lasted for several days. The trial ended on 4 December 1869 with a hung jury, albeit mostly in favour of a nominal verdict – eventually prompting both sides to consent to discharging the jury without a verdict. Levin left New Zealand on 27 December 1869, and resigned from the Legislative Council in 1871, having never made a speech.

== Later life and death ==
After having arrived in England in 1868, Tetley moved to Paraguay or Uruguay. He was said to be living near Fray Bentos where he was cattle farming. Eventually, he reportedly moved to Colonia del Sacramento, Uruguay, and died in Nueva Helvecia, Uruguay, on 21 August 1878. At the time, Cadwallader, his middle son, was farming in Estanzuela, Uruguay near Colonia del Sacramento.
