= RAF Dalton =

Royal Air Force base in Yorkshire, England

RAF Dalton
- Dalton, North Yorkshire in England

Site information
- Type: Royal Air Force satellite station 1941-43; 61 (RCAF) Substation 1943-44; 76 Base Substation 1944-
- Code: DA
- Owner: Air Ministry
- Operator: Royal Air Force; Royal Canadian Air Force
- Controlled by: RAF Bomber Command * No. 4 Group RAF * No. 6 Group RCAF

Location
- Shown within North Yorkshire RAF Dalton (the United Kingdom)
- Coordinates: 54°10′37″N 1°21′35″W

Site history
- Built: 1940/41
- In use: November 1941 – December 1945
- Battles/wars: European theatre of World War II

Airfield information
- Elevation: 24 metres (79 ft) AMSL
Runways
Direction	Length and surface
00/00	Tarmac
00/00	Tarmac
00/00	Tarmac

Royal Air Force Dalton or more simply RAF Dalton is a former Royal Air Force satellite station located near to Dalton, North Yorkshire, England.

The airfield was by RAF Bomber Command during the Second World War. It was a satellite of nearby RAF Topcliffe.

== History ==
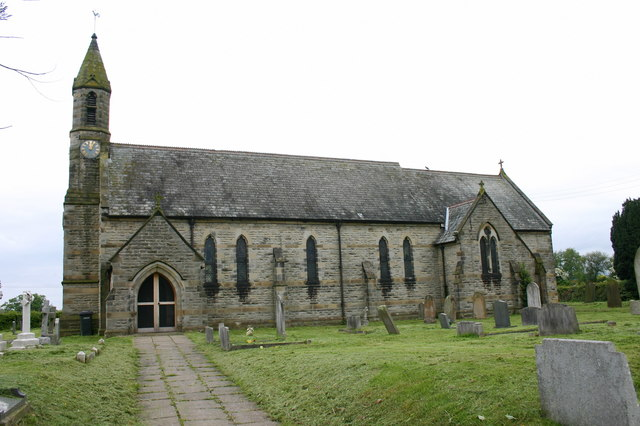
The village church of the village that gave the station its name

RAF Dalton was home to No. 102 Squadron beginning in November 1941. No. 102 Squadron returned to Topcliffe in June 1942 and for a time Dalton hosted No. 1652 Heavy Conversion Unit RAF (HCU) flying Handley Page Halifaxes. The airfield was improved in 1942 and in early 1943 was allocated to No. 6 Group Royal Canadian Air Force (RCAF). Canadian squadrons stationed here at one time or another included No. 428 Squadron, No. 424 Squadron, No. 420 Squadron, and No. 1666 Heavy Conversion Unit RAF (which moved to RAF Wombleton in October 1943). The station also housed No. 1691 Bomber Gunnery Flight RCAF and its successor, No. 1695 Bomber Defence Training Flight RCAF, the last RCAF unit to serve at this station.

In November 1944, control passed from No. 6 Group to the new No. 7 (Training) Group. By August 1945 all units at Dalton were disbanded or transferred.

== Operational units and aircraft ==
data from
Unit	From	To	Aircraft	Version
No. 102 Squadron RAF	15 November 1941	7 June 1942	Armstrong Whitworth Whitley; Handley Page Halifax	Mk.V; Mk.II
No. 420 Squadron RCAF	6 November 1943	12 December 1943	Vickers Wellington	Mk.X
No. 424 Squadron RCAF	3 May 1943	15 May 1943	Vickers Wellington	Mk.X
No. 428 Squadron RCAF	7 November 1942	31 May 1943	Vickers Wellington	Mks.III and X
No. 1652 HCU	13 July 1942	22 August 1942	Handley Page Halifax	Mks.I, II
No. 1666 'Mohawk' HCU	5 June 1943	21 October 1943	Handley Page Halifax	Mks.II, III
No. 1691 (Bombing) (Gunnery) Flight	26 June 1943	15 February 1944	Miles Martinet; Airspeed Oxford	Mk.I; Mk.II
No. 1695 (Bomber) Defence Training Flight	15 February 1944	23 April 1945	Miles Martinet; Hawker Hurricane; Supermarine Spitfire	Mk.I; MksIIc, IV; Mk.I, IIa, Vb, Vc

== Current use ==
The aerodrome facilities are now being used for commercial and industrial uses.

A major employer on the estate is Severfield plc. In 2011, Severfield and Mace test assembled the Shard's spire on the airfield before breaking it down again for transport to London and final assembly.
