= Topcliffe Toll Booth =

Building in Topcliffe, North Yorkshire, England

Coordinates: 54°10′41″N 1°23′14″W

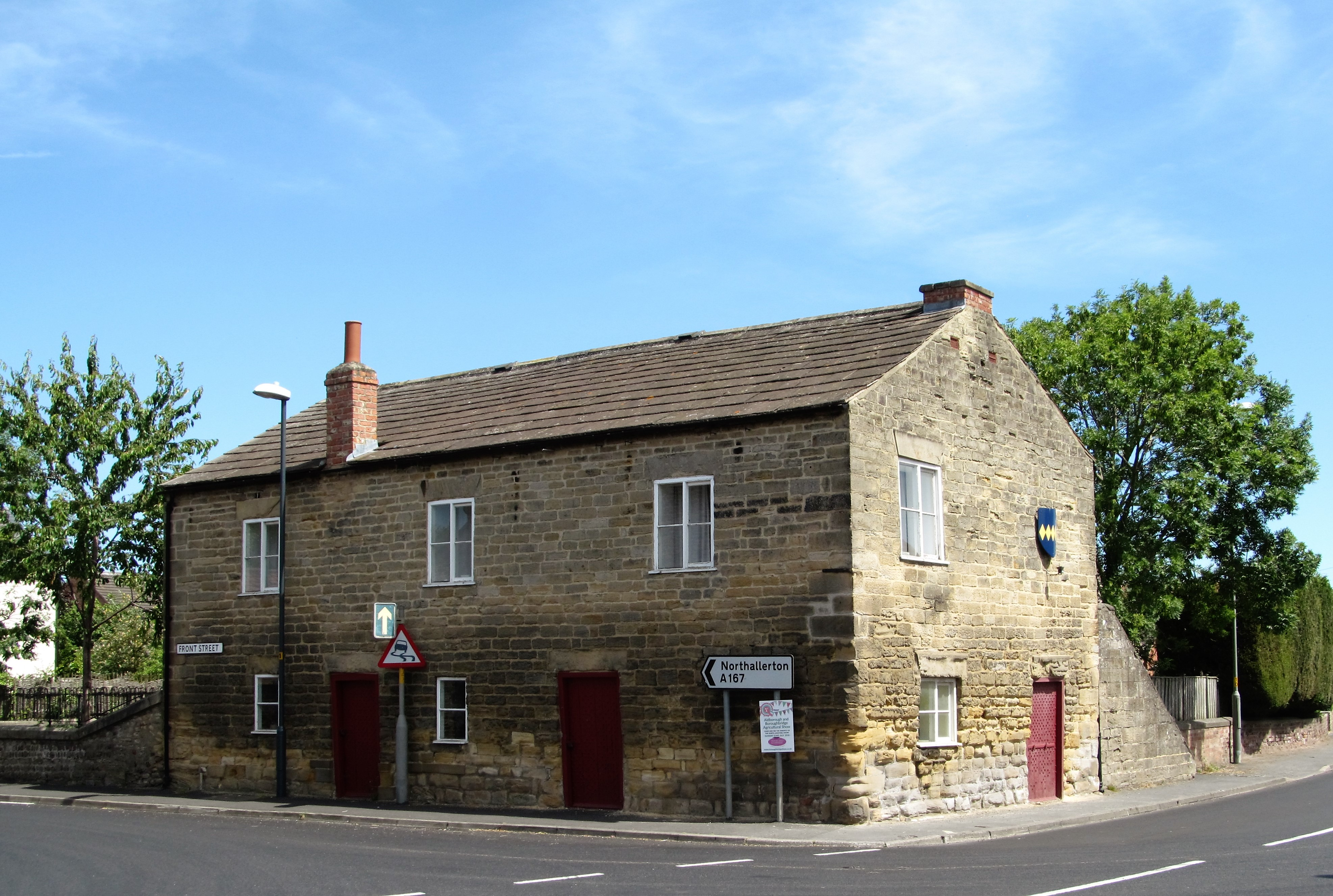
The building, in 2018

Topcliffe Toll Booth is a historic building in Topcliffe, North Yorkshire, a village in England.

A single-storey toll booth was constructed in the 17th century, to collect tolls from the adjacent market. A local tradition claims that a ransom for Charles I of Great Britain was paid in the building to Scottish troops during the English Civil War. A second storey was added in the 19th century, and the lower storey was altered. The building was grade II listed in 1952. The building has served variously as a jail, a reading room, and a meeting place for the court leet. In 1968, there were plans to demolish the building to improve traffic flow, but these were not taken up. By 2004, the downstairs room was used for storage, and the upstairs room as a snooker club. That year, the parish council planned to convert it into a village hall with historical displays and tourist information.

The house is built of stone with quoins and a stone slate roof. It has two storeys and three bays. On the front are two doorways with plain lintels, and a similar doorway on the right return. The upper floor contains casement windows with wedge lintels, and at the rear a flight of 13 steps with a coped parapet leads up to a doorway with a wedge lintel.

== See also ==
- Listed buildings in Topcliffe, North Yorkshire
