= Topcliffe, North Yorkshire =

Village and civil parish in North Yorkshire, England

Coordinates: 54°10′42″N 1°23′13″W

Topcliffe
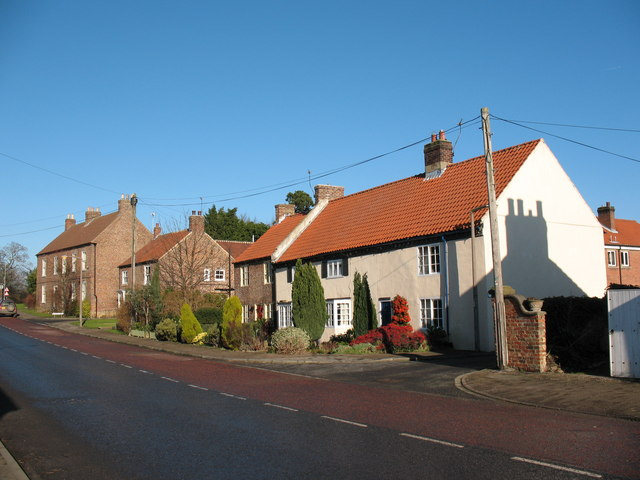
- Front Street, Topcliffe

- Location within North Yorkshire
- Population: 1,489 (2011 census)
- OS grid reference: SE402760
- Civil parish: Topcliffe
- Unitary authority: North Yorkshire
- Ceremonial county: North Yorkshire
- Region: Yorkshire and the Humber
- Country: England
- Sovereign state: United Kingdom
- Post town: THIRSK
- Postcode district: YO7
- Dialling code: 01845
- Police: North Yorkshire
- Fire: North Yorkshire
- Ambulance: Yorkshire
- UK Parliament: Thirsk and Malton

Topcliffe is a village and civil parish in North Yorkshire, England. The village is situated on the River Swale, on the A167 road and close to the A168. It is about 5 miles (8 km) south-west of Thirsk and 11 miles (18 km) south of the county town of Northallerton. It has a population of 1,489. An army barracks, with a Royal Air Force airfield enclosed within, is located to the north of the village.

== History ==
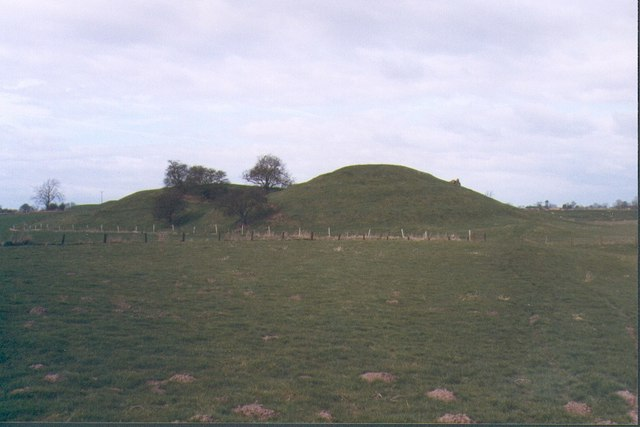
Topcliffe Castle, Maidens Bower

The name is derived from the Old English words topp and clif and combined give the meaning top of the cliff, from its position at the top of a steep bank overlooking the River Swale.

The village is mentioned in the Domesday Book of 1086 as "Topeclive" in the Yarlestre wapentake. At the time of the Norman Conquest in 1066, the manor was the possession of Bernwulf. Afterwards it was granted to William of Percy. The manor became the chief seat of the Percy family until the middle of the 17th century, though there was some confusion of the line of inheritance in the 12th century. There was a short interruption to this line in the 15th century when the manor was granted to the Neville family following the death of Henry Percy, 3rd Earl of Northumberland at the Battle of Towton in 1461, where he was fighting for the Lancastrians who lost. This was reversed in 1469 and the manor restored to the Percy family. In the 16th century there were two other brief periods when the manor was granted first to the Archbishop of York and then to the Earl of Warwick. The manor was restored to the Percy family in 1557. The last of the family to hold the manor in their name was Josceline Percy, 11th Earl of Northumberland, though it passed to his daughter who married Charles Seymour, 6th Duke of Somerset. Their son inherited the manor, but he died heirless and the manor was passed to his nephew Charles Wyndham, 2nd Earl of Egremont. The manor remained in the Wyndham family into the 20th century.

A motte and bailey castle was built at the strategic location of the junction of the River Swale and Cod Beck about 1071, soon after the Harrying of the North and re-fortified in 1174 by the Percy family. This was the principal residence of the Percy family until the early part of the fourteenth century, when Henry de Percy purchased the barony and castle of Alnwick. The castle was succeeded by a moated manor house on an adjacent site, of which earthworks also remain. The manor house was the home of John Topcliffe, Lord Chief Justice of Ireland, who died in 1513.

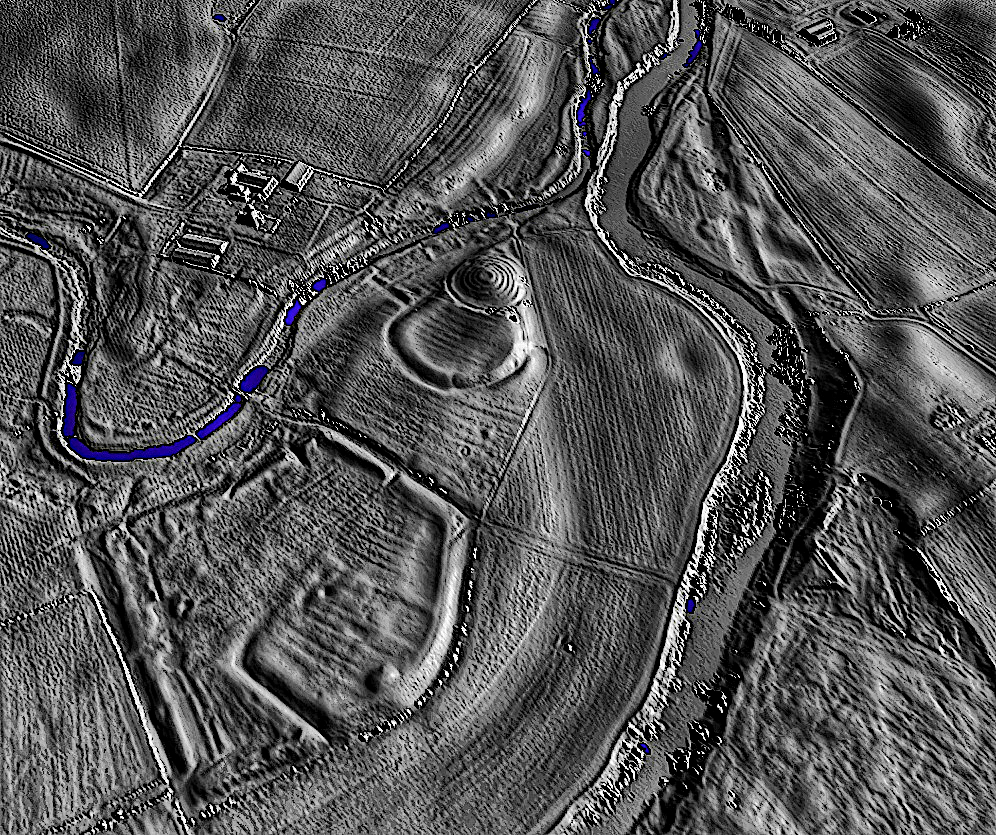
A lidar view of Topcliffe Castle and Cock Lodge.

The village was the centre of a large ancient parish in the North Riding of Yorkshire. The parish included the townships of Asenby, Baldersby, Catton, Dalton, Dishforth, Eldmire with Crakehill, Marton-le-Moor, Rainton with Newby, Skipton-on-Swale and Topcliffe. All of these townships became separate civil parishes in 1866.

The village used to be a stop between Baldersby and Thirsk on the Leeds & Thirsk Railway. Topcliffe railway station was opened on 1 June 1848 and closed on 14 September 1959. It was located at the junction of the A167 and Catton Moor Lane to the north of the village near the present day MoD base.

=== Topcliffe Airfield ===
During the Second World War an airfield was constructed 1.5 miles (2.4 km) from the village which was for some time a Royal Canadian Air Force base. After the war it had a number of roles until 1972 when much of it was taken over by the army and converted into Alanbrooke Barracks. The airfield continues to be used for Air Cadet glider training.

== Governance ==
The village is located in the Thirsk and Malton UK Parliamentary constituency. It was in the Topcliffe ward of Hambleton District Council. The population of this ward taken at the 2011 Census was 2,604. Topcliffe District ward includes the settlements of Skipton-on-Swale, Catton, Dalton, Crakehill, Sessay and Hutton Sessay. From 1974 to 2023 it was part of the Hambleton District, it is now administered by the unitary North Yorkshire Council.

The civil parish of Topcliffe is bounded by the civil parishes of Sowerby, Carlton Miniott, Catton, Rainton, Asenby, Crakehill and Dalton. The local Parish Council has five members.

== Geography ==
The village is located on the east bank of the River Swale just north of its confluence with Cod Beck, one of its major tributaries. The villages of Baldersby St James, Cundall, Dishforth, Catton, Rainton, Asenby, Crakehill and Dalton all lie within a radius of 2.5 miles (4.0 km). It lies on the A167 road from Darlington to its terminus at the junction with the A168. It is 2.8 miles (4.5 km) east of the A1(M).

=== Climate ===
On the early morning of 3 December 2010, the weather station air temperature was −19 °C (−2 °F), making it the lowest temperature ever recorded in Yorkshire. It regularly features in the Met Office stats as having the lowest minimum temperature anywhere in the UK. During the July 2022 heatwave, the 39.6 °C (103.3 °F) was recorded at Topcliffe.

Climate data for Topcliffe airfield (North Yorkshire): elevation: 25 m (82 ft) Average maximum and minimum temperatures, and average rainfall recorded between 1991 and 2020 by the Met Office. Sunshine hours are for Leeming, as no data has been recorded at Topcliffe.
Month	Jan	Feb	Mar	Apr	May	Jun	Jul	Aug	Sep	Oct	Nov	Dec	Year
Mean daily maximum °C (°F)	6.8 (44.2)	7.4 (45.3)	9.9 (49.8)	12.5 (54.5)	15.7 (60.3)	18.2 (64.8)	20.9 (69.6)	20.4 (68.7)	17.7 (63.9)	13.6 (56.5)	9.5 (49.1)	6.7 (44.1)	13.3 (55.9)
Mean daily minimum °C (°F)	0.4 (32.7)	0.1 (32.2)	1.5 (34.7)	3.2 (37.8)	5.8 (42.4)	8.9 (48.0)	11.2 (52.2)	10.6 (51.1)	8.4 (47.1)	5.6 (42.1)	2.4 (36.3)	-0.0 (32.0)	4.86 (40.75)
Average precipitation mm (inches)	55.3 (2.18)	39.5 (1.56)	45.4 (1.79)	53.3 (2.10)	42.7 (1.68)	59.7 (2.35)	54.1 (2.13)	62.5 (2.46)	50.5 (1.99)	58.7 (2.31)	63.3 (2.49)	58.9 (2.32)	644 (25.4)
Average precipitation days (≥ 1.0 mm)	10.9	8.7	10	9.3	8.8	9.1	9.8	9.9	9.0	10.4	10.9	11.1	117.9
Mean monthly sunshine hours	58.1	81.7	121.5	153.8	195.0	175.9	185.5	171.2	132.7	93.4	63.7	54.2	1,486.7
Source 1: Met Office
Source 2: Met Office

== Demography ==
In 1881 the UK Census recorded the population as 615. The 2001 UK Census recorded the population as 1,336 in 400 households. The population was 58.7% male and 41.3% female.

The 2011 UK Census recorded the population as 1,489, an increase of 11.45% compared with the previous census. The population was 59.1% male and 40.9% female. The ethnic mix was made of 92.4% White British, 1.5% Mixed race, 2.6 Asian. 1.9% Black and 1.5% other race.

== Economy ==
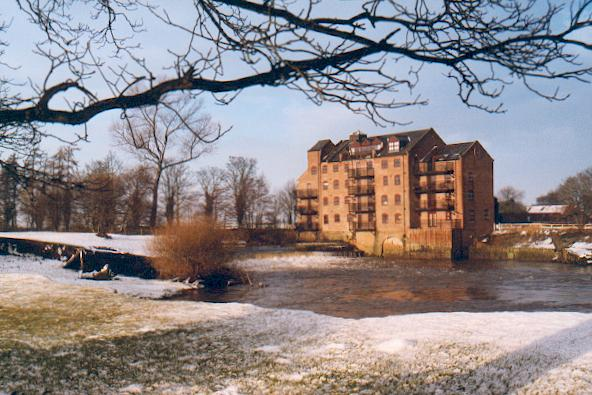
Topcliffe Mill

The village is surrounded by farmland and it played an important role in the past as a major market place, much lessened these days. There are a number of small businesses in and around the village. There is a large industrial estate within the Parish boundary on the outskirts of neighbouring Dalton. On the outskirts near the bridge over the river is a caravan park.

On Catton Lane just outside the village is Topcliffe Mill, a Grade II Listed building. A mill at Topcliffe was mentioned in the Domesday Book and may have been situated on the current site of the Roller Mill, which produced flour until 1961. It had been converted into a restaurant and now houses apartments.

== Culture and community ==
Topcliffe is home to Deer Shed Festival, an annual music festival established in 2010, which attracts over 10,000 people to the village every July.

Topcliffe has a park and two pubs, The Angel (currently closed for refurbishment) and The Swan. The old school house of Topcliffe is now a post office, and Topcliffe Toll Booth is now a cottage.

Topcliffe has been extended over the years. East Lea was built in the 1950s and has been developed over the years, by the demolition of some old houses on a sizeable plot of land, to make way for extra houses. In the late 1980s, Manor Close and a small part of Winn Lane were built on the site of a farm.

== Transport ==
The village lies on two main routes through the county, the A167 and A168. The A168 bypass was first considered in 1963 as part of "The North East Programme for Regional Development and Growth". Work did not start though until 1976 and took two years to complete.

The village is served by the bus route between Ripon and Northallerton.

== Education ==
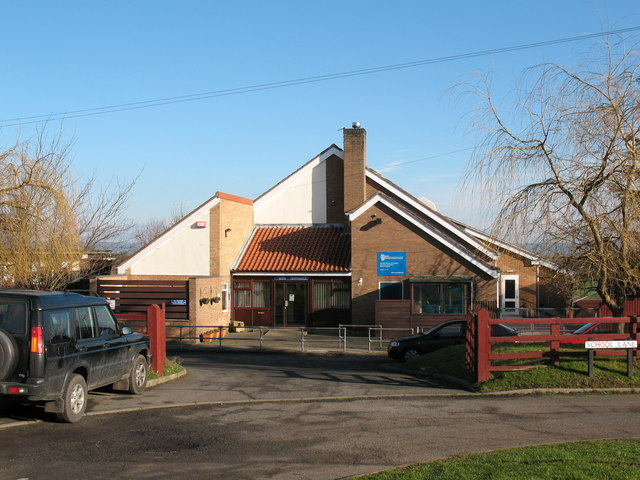
The primary school at Topcliffe

There has been a school in the village since the establishment of a Free Grammar School in 1549. A school house was built in 1822 on the site of one previously erected in 1695. The Grade II listed building is located in the north side of the St Columba churchyard.

The current primary school at Topcliffe was opened in 1966. It is a Church of England and caters for mixed genders from years 1–6, and a playgroup. It has a student capacity of 114. The school is within the catchment area of Thirsk School and Sixth Form College for secondary education. The nearby Army Barracks operate a school primarily for Service personnel. It was opened in 1953. Queen Mary's School is a private day and boarding school for girls. Boys may attend up to age 7 (Year 2) and does not have a sixth form.

== Religion ==
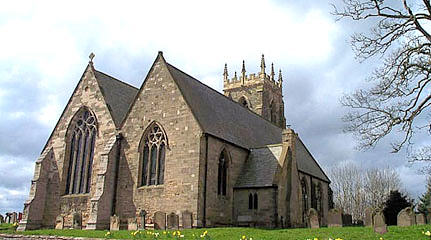
The Church of St Columba, Topcliffe

St Columba's Church, Topcliffe is the Anglican parish church. As the name suggests, there has been a church in the site since early Saxon times, possibly around the time of St Aiden's mission in 650 AD. The present building date from the 13th century with improvements being made throughout the ages. It is a Grade II* listed building.

There is a Wesleyan Methodist Church in the village built in 1840 located in Church Street opposite St Columba Church. It is a Grade II Listed building.

== Sport ==
Topcliffe Football Club play at the Playing Fields on Winn Lane, next to the Bowling Club. They play in local leagues but have been in existence since at least the 1920s.

== Notable residents ==
- William Henry Dixon (1783–1854), antiquarian
- Joseph Tetley (1825–1878), New Zealand politician and fraudster (born in Topcliffe)
- John Topcliffe (died 1513), Lord Chief Justice of Ireland
- Darley Waddilove (1736–1828), dean of Ripon

== See also ==
- Listed buildings in Topcliffe, North Yorkshire
