= Kekerengu =

Settlement in Canterbury, New Zealand

- Settlement
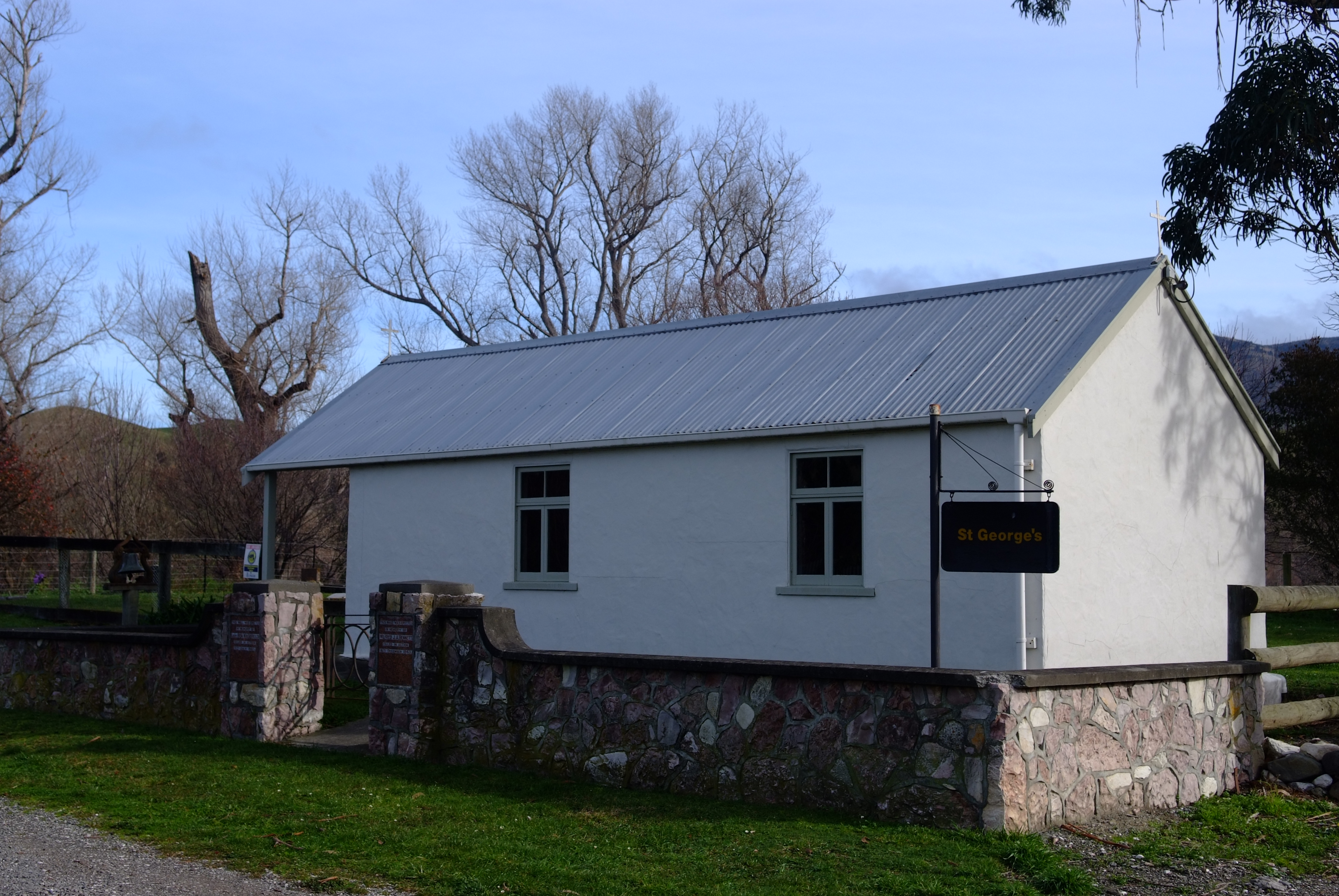
- Saint George's Church, Kekerengu
- Interactive map of Kekerengu
- Coordinates: 42°00′11″S 174°00′30″E
- Country: New Zealand
- Region: Canterbury
- Territorial authority: Kaikōura District
- Electorates: Kaikōura; Te Tai Tonga (Māori)

Government
  - Territorial Authority: Kaikōura District Council
  - Kaikōura District Mayor: Craig Mackle
  - Kaikōura MP: Stuart Smith
  - Te Tai Tonga MP: Tākuta Ferris
- Time zone: UTC+12 (New Zealand Standard Time)
  - Summer (DST): UTC+13 (New Zealand Daylight Time)
- Postcode: 7274

Kekerengu (Māori pronunciation: [ˈkɛkɛrɛŋʉ]) is a settlement in northern Kaikōura District, Canterbury, South Island. It is situated along State Highway 1 between Kaikōura and Blenheim. The locality is named for Te Kēkerengū, a chief of the Ngāti Ira hapū who was slain in the region alongside his mother and followers. The settlement was organised as a sheep station by Joseph Tetley in the 1860s. Tetley expanded the station into a village, but fled to Uruguay in 1868 to avoid massive debts. In addition to the Kekerengu Station buildings, a Heritage New Zealand-listed historic place, Kekerengu is home to Saint George's Church, one of the smallest church buildings still in use in New Zealand.

== History ==
Kekerengu is named for Te Kēkerengū, an early 19th century chief of the hapū of Ngāti Ira, the son of chief Whanake and his wife Tāmairangi. Fleeing hostilities from the Ngāti Toa and Ngāti Mutunga, Te Kēkerengū and Tāmairangi fled with their followers to the South Island. They were killed along the eastern coast of the island, although the culprits and location differ in local histories, generally attributed to either the forces of the pursuing Te Rauparaha, or to the local Ngāi Tahu itself. One attributed location of their deaths was afterwards dubbed Te Kotinga-o-Kēkerengū ('the dismemberment of Kekerengu'). The site was initially spelled Kekerangu by early settlers, and pronounced "Giggerigoo".

=== Kekerengu Station ===
In 1859, Joseph Tetley purchased an 80-acre plot along the Kekerengu River from Frederick Trolove, where he built a homestead. He leased 8,000 acres of land in the region in 1860, purchasing it outright seven years later. Here, he established Kekerengu Station, a large sheep station employing various ranch-hands and shearers. Two large cob residences were built at the station, serving as a worker's dormitory and manager's residence. They also provided shelter for travellers and swaggers, and were still in use for that purpose as late as the Great Depression. Today, they are a listed by Heritage New Zealand as a Category 2 historic place.

In 1868, the settlement was described by Bishop Andrew Suter as an "English village". It featured a schoolhouse, chapel, graveyard, expanded traveller's accommodations, and a post and telegraph office. Incurring massive debts, Tetley fled to Uruguay. The station alternated between various owners over the following decades, and is still in use under the name of Kekerengu Valley Farm.

The settlement is located near the Kekerengu Fault. Following the 2016 Kaikōura earthquake, the locality was cut off from the rest of Canterbury for over a year.

== Geography ==
Kekerengu is a small settlement located at the mouth of the Kekerengu River, on State Highway 1 in the Kaikōura District of Canterbury, near its border with Marlborough. It is located 56 kilometres (35 mi) from the district seat of Kaikōura, and 73 kilometres (45 mi) south of Blenheim in neighboring Marlborough district. The locality was part of Marlborough District until 1989, when it was transferred to the newly-formed Kaikōura.

=== Features ===
In 1942, a local store was converted into Saint George’s Church, one of the smallest church buildings still in use in New Zealand. Winterhome, a garden in the locality, is recognised as a Garden of National Significance by the New Zealand Gardens Trust. The Store, a popular roadside cafe and restaurant, is located in Kekerengu; it was built on what was previously a petrol station and convenience store.

=== Demographics ===
The 2013 census recorded 84 residents and 30 households in Kekerengu.

Kekerengu locality, which includes Clarence, New Zealand, covers 239.70 km^{2} (92.55 sq mi). It is part of the larger Kaikōura Ranges statistical area.

Historical population
Year	Pop.	±% p.a.
2006	144	—
2013	156	+1.15%
2018	150	−0.78%
2023	159	+1.17%

Kekerengu locality had a population of 159 in the 2023 New Zealand census, an increase of 9 people (6.0%) since the 2018 census, and an increase of 3 people (1.9%) since the 2013 census. There were 87 males and 72 females in 66 dwellings. The median age was 43.0 years (compared with 38.1 years nationally). There were 24 people (15.1%) aged under 15 years, 30 (18.9%) aged 15 to 29, 75 (47.2%) aged 30 to 64, and 30 (18.9%) aged 65 or older.

People could identify as more than one ethnicity. The results were 92.5% European (Pākehā), 17.0% Māori, 1.9% Asian, and 3.8% other, which includes people giving their ethnicity as "New Zealander". English was spoken by 98.1%, Māori by 1.9%, and other languages by 9.4%. No language could be spoken by 1.9% (e.g. too young to talk). The percentage of people born overseas was 11.3, compared with 28.8% nationally.

Religious affiliations were 24.5% Christian, 1.9% Māori religious beliefs, 1.9% Buddhist, and 1.9% New Age. People who answered that they had no religion were 62.3%, and 5.7% of people did not answer the census question.

Of those at least 15 years old, 24 (17.8%) people had a bachelor's or higher degree, 84 (62.2%) had a post-high school certificate or diploma, and 24 (17.8%) people exclusively held high school qualifications. The median income was $37,700, compared with $41,500 nationally. 9 people (6.7%) earned over $100,000 compared to 12.1% nationally. The employment status of those at least 15 was 69 (51.1%) full-time and 24 (17.8%) part-time.
