= Nathaniel Levin =

New Zealand merchant (1818–1903)

The Honourable Nathaniel Levin

Member of the Legislative Council
- In office 25 June 1869 – 11 January 1871
- Appointed by: Edward Stafford

Personal details
- Born: Nathaniel William Levin; 4 May 1818 London, United Kingdom
- Died: 30 April 1903 (aged 84)
- Spouse: Jessie Levin (m. 31 July 1844, died 1904)
- Children: William Levin, Lionel Levin, Anne Levin
- Occupation: Merchant, politician

Nathaniel William Levin (4 May 1818 – 30 April 1903) was a merchant and politician in New Zealand.

== Wellington, New Zealand ==
Levin, born in 1818 in London, England, came to the new settlement of Wellington in 1841, and set himself up in business selling drapery hosiery and haberdashery on Lambton Quay in partnership with Abraham Hort Jr, who would become his brother-in-law. In 1843, following Levin and Hort's successful business ventures, the rest of Hort's family moved to New Zealand – and Levin subsequently married Jessie Hort (Abraham Hort Jr's sister) on 31 July 1844.

== Levin & Co ==
The business soon moved to importing food and liquor and exporting whale oil and whale bone and gradually established itself as a shipping and land agency. Sheep farming grew as whaling declined and wool exports replaced the whaling products. In 1862 he went into partnership with Charles Johnson Pharazyn. By 1868, Levin was depressed by the stagnation of the business of the colony and decided to arrange his affairs so he might return to England. He ended his partnership with Pharazyn and the business activities were taken over by his eldest son W H Levin in partnership with Charles Pharazyn and Walter Johnston. At the end of 1869, he and his wife left for England.

== Redfern Alexander & Co ==
He became a partner in the firm of his former London agents for 12 years, retired in 1882 in his mid-60s and died in 1903. His wife Jessie died the following year.

In 1999, Levin was posthumously inducted into the New Zealand Business Hall of Fame.

== Parliament, legal issues, and departure from New Zealand ==
Nathaniel Levin was the first Jewish appointee to the New Zealand Legislative Council. He was appointed on 25 June 1869, and his membership lapsed on 11 January 1871; he had returned to England at the end of 1869. His departure followed a widely publicised defamation trial, suing Richard Beaumont for slander after Beumont accused Levin of complicity in Joseph Tetley's fraudulent business activities – despite both Levin and Beaumont being victims of Tetley. Neither party was awarded anything by the court. He never made a speech in the Legislative Council.

His son, William Levin, continued his trading company in Wellington.

== See also ==
- History of the Jews in New Zealand
