= Dalton, east North Yorkshire =

Village and civil parish in North Yorkshire, England

Coordinates: 54°10′51″N 1°20′33″W

Dalton
- Location within North Yorkshire
- Population: 518 (2011 census)
- OS grid reference: SE434763
- Civil parish: Dalton
- Unitary authority: North Yorkshire
- Ceremonial county: North Yorkshire
- Region: Yorkshire and the Humber
- Country: England
- Sovereign state: United Kingdom
- Post town: THIRSK
- Postcode district: YO7
- Dialling code: 01845
- Police: North Yorkshire
- Fire: North Yorkshire
- Ambulance: Yorkshire

Dalton is a village and civil parish in the county of North Yorkshire, England. It is about 4 miles (6.4 km) south of Thirsk and near the A168 road. It mainly consists of farmland as well as an industrial estate. It has a population of 518.

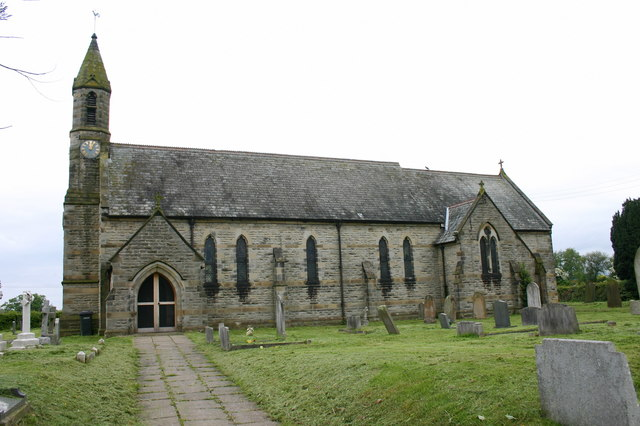
Church of St John the Evangelist, Dalton

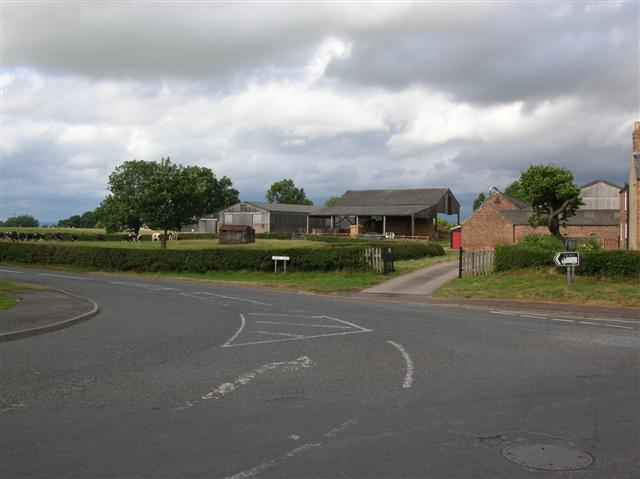
Edge of Dalton

== History ==
The toponym is first recorded as Deltone in the Domesday Book of 1086. The name is derived from the Old English dæl "valley" and tūn "settlement", so means "valley settlement".

Dalton had 10.2 households in 1066 which is quite a small amount in comparison to other parishes according to the Domesday book. The total tax assessed is 5.2 geld units, which is quite large for a parish. The Lord in 1066 was called Bernwulf and the value to the lord was £4. The Lord as well as tenant-in-chief in 1086 was William of Percy and the value was £5. Dalton had 15 ploughlands, one mill, one church and four furlongs worth of woodland.

In 1086 Dalton was a berewick (outlying estate) of Topcliffe, and by the 15th century was known as a manor. Until the 19th century it remained a township of the large ancient parish of Topcliffe in the wapentake of Birdforth in the North Riding of Yorkshire. In 1866 it became a separate civil parish.

In 1870, John Marius Wilson recorded:

Dalton, a township in Topcliffe parish, N. R. Yorkshire; on the Great North of England railway, 4¼ miles S of Thirsk. Acres, 1, 247. Real property, £1, 709. Pop., 307. Houses, 77. There are chapels for Wesleyans and Primitive Methodists.

In 1890 Dalton was made up of 2,649 acres of land and 177 acres were covered in plantations. Some of it was elevated moorland and the rest was fertile land. A small ‘chapel of ease’ was created here in 1839 in which a service used to be held every second Sunday morning of the month, and every evening on all the other Sundays. In 1855 the Wesleyan Methodist Chapel was created which was described as “a very small and plain building”.

During the Second World War, RAF Dalton was used as an airfield by RAF Bomber Command. It was home to No.102 Squadron in November 1941. In 1943 it was allocated to No.6 Group Royal Canadian Air Force (RCAF).

From 1974 to 2023 it was part of the Hambleton District. It is now administered by the unitary North Yorkshire Council.

== Geography ==
The distance from London to Dalton is 191 miles (307 km). The closest railway station is Thirsk station, which is 5 miles (8 km) away.

== Demographics ==
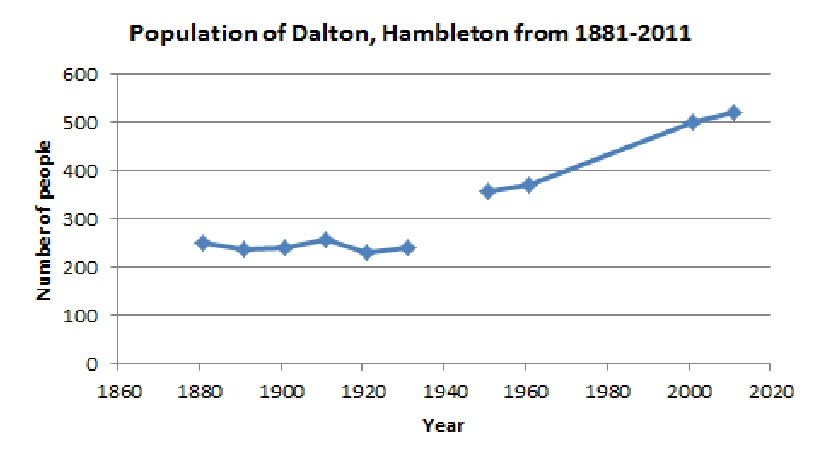
Population time series graph of Dalton, Hambleton from 1881–2011

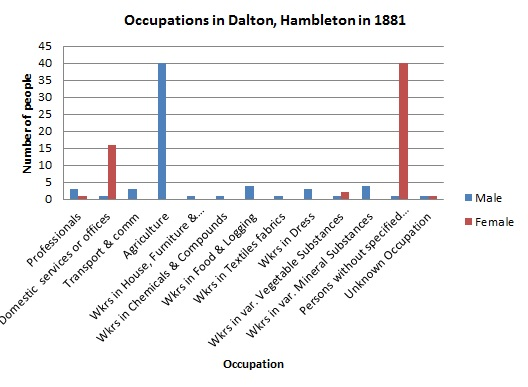
Occupations in Dalton, Hambleton in 1881

=== Occupation history ===
In 1881 the dominant occupation was in agriculture, with 40 males in that profession. In 2011 this had changed to 32 males becoming Managers, Directors and Senior Officials in Dalton. In 1881 the main profession for females was domestic services or offices, by 2011 this had changed to 16 women being Managers and Senior professionals.

=== Housing ===
The average price of a property in North Yorkshire is £193,666. In the postcode region YO7 the average for all properties is £224,608. In 1881 there were 67 houses, by 1951 this had increased to 104 and then 10 years later, in 1961 decreased to 83. Between 1881 and 1901 there were six houses vacant and none being reconstructed, this means that many houses must have been built by 1951.

== Education ==
Currently, there are ten schools with a three-mile radius of Dalton, such as Topcliffe-pre school playgroup which is 1.7 miles (2.7 km) away. According to the 2009 Ofsted report, the ‘Overall effectiveness’ was given a score of 2. Primary schools include Cundall Manor Preparatory School, Sessay Church of England Voluntary Controlled Primary School and Queen Mary’s School.

== See also ==
- Listed buildings in Dalton, east North Yorkshire
