= Topcliffe Mill =

Historic building in Topcliffe, North Yorkshire

Coordinates: 54°10′54″N 1°23′37″W

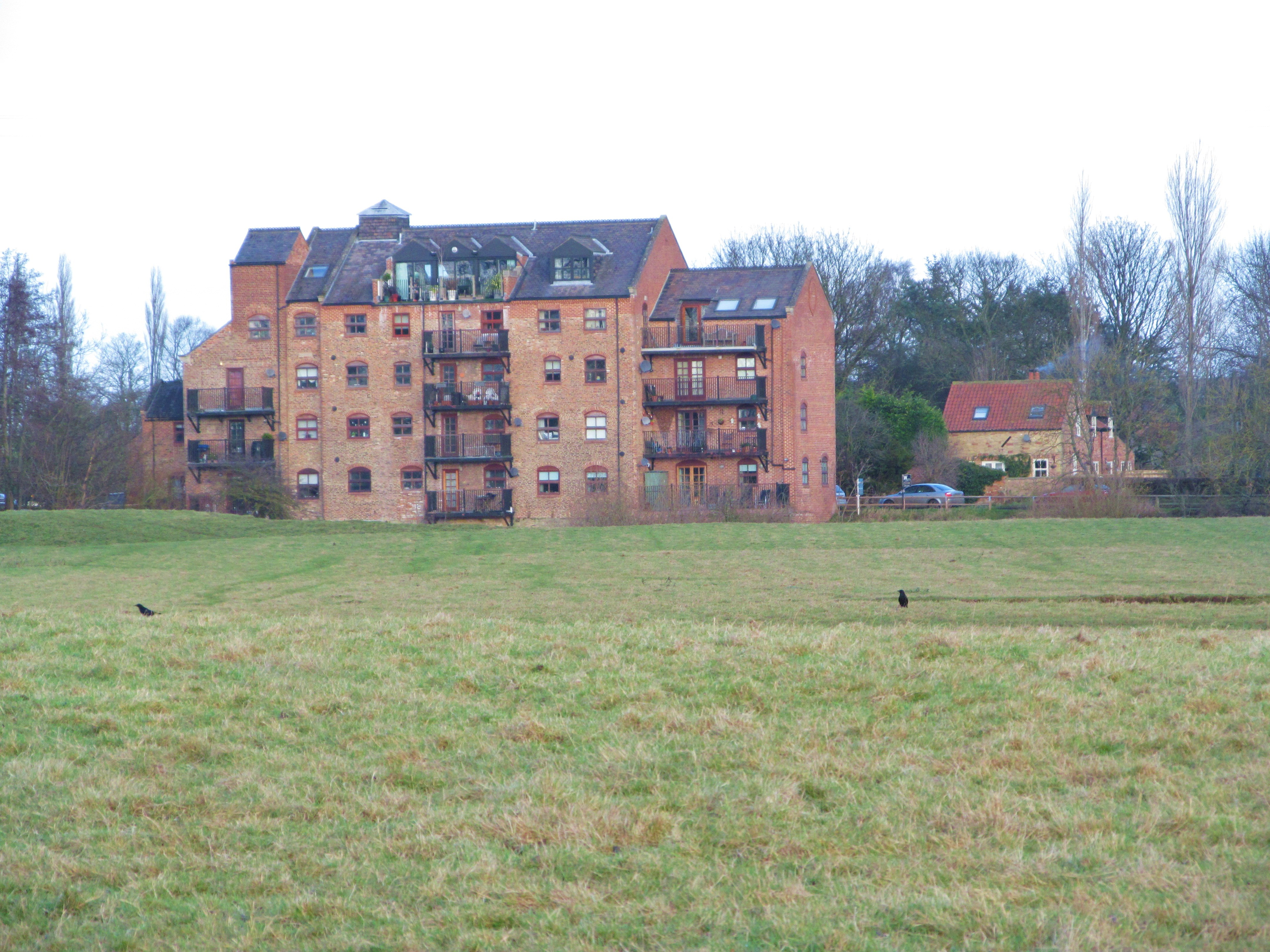
The building, in 2014

Topcliffe Mill is a historic building in Topcliffe, North Yorkshire, a village in England.

The watermill was constructed in the mid-18th century, and served as a corn mill for many years. It lies on the River Swale, and by the 19th century, was the northernmost navigable point on the river. In its early years, the mill was managed by Henry Dresser, great grandfather of Henry Eeles Dresser. The building was grade II listed in 1988. The mill has been converted into flats, which flooded in 2012.

The building is constructed of red brick and stone with a pantile roof. The main block has four storeys and three bays, to the right is a three-storey gabled bay, and a projecting two-storey bay. On the left gable is a three-story outshut. The doorways and the windows, which are casements, have elliptical-arched heads.

== See also ==
- Listed buildings in Topcliffe, North Yorkshire
