= Rainton =

Village and civil parish in North Yorkshire, England

Coordinates: 54.17098°N 1.43453°W

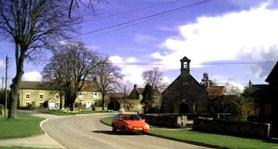
- Rainton

- Location within North Yorkshire
- Population: 447 (2011 Census)
- Civil parish: Rainton with Newby
- Unitary authority: North Yorkshire
- Ceremonial county: North Yorkshire
- Region: Yorkshire and the Humber
- Country: England
- Sovereign state: United Kingdom
- Post town: THIRSK
- Postcode district: YO7
- Police: North Yorkshire
- Fire: North Yorkshire
- Ambulance: Yorkshire

Rainton is a village in the county of North Yorkshire, England. It is situated about 6 miles (9.7 km) north of Boroughbridge, 5 miles (8 km) north-east of Ripon and 5 miles (8 km) south-west of Thirsk. The area has a village green and a maypole. There are approximately 120 houses in Rainton including six listed buildings, several period farm houses, a smithy and a dovecote. The local vernacular building style is sandstone and cobble construction with slate or pantile roof.

== History ==
The village was mentioned in the Domesday Book as having 30 ploughlands and belonging to Count Alan of Brittany. The name is thought to have derived from Old English (though it could be Old Norse) of the Tūn of Regna's/Rægen's peaople.

Rainton was historically in the parish of Topcliffe in the North Riding of Yorkshire, part of the township of Rainton with Newby. The township became a separate civil parish in 1866, and in 1974 was transferred to the new county of North Yorkshire. From 1974 to 2023 it was part of the Borough of Harrogate, it is now administered by the unitary North Yorkshire Council.

Rainton was a largely agricultural village. However, since 2000, it has become a commuter village, largely due to its close proximity to the A1(M). This in turn has led to an increase in property prices which is evidenced by the large number of barn conversions and property renovations. Rainton continues to host Christmas parties for local children, lunches for retired people, and other social events including a gardening club.

Rainton is the principal settlement in the civil parish of Rainton with Newby. Newby, historically known as Newby-on-Swale, is a deserted medieval village, now occupied by Baldersby Park (also known as Newby Park), the home of Queen Mary's School.

At the 2001 Census, the population of the parish was 354, which had risen to 447 by the time of the 2011 Census. In 2015, North Yorkshire County Council estimated that the population had fallen slightly to 440.

== Facilities ==
The local school is based at Baldersby St James.

There are two freehold pubs in the village: The Lamb and The Bay Horse which are both traditional village pubs. In 2011, The Lamb diversified into being a village shop as well as a pub.

A recreation field, including a children's park, opened in 2000 after local fundraising. The children's park obtained further funds to provide new equipment for older children, which was completed in 2016. The cricket club has two teams which have a new pavilion, built largely by the hands-on cricket team and villagers themselves.

There is a Methodist chapel in Rainton. The church at nearby Baldersby St James has a 'impressive' steeple.

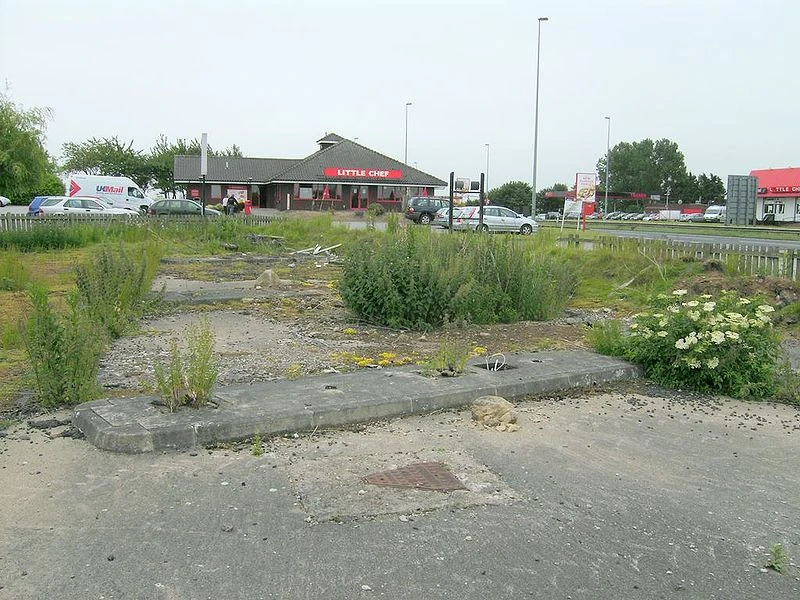
Little Chef Rainton South

The village had historically had a service station dating back to 1978. This was initially Station Supreme, however by 1983, the Station Supreme cafes on both sides, along with the southbound filling station, had closed and the cafe buildings were replaced with Happy Eaters. By 1995 the Happy Eater had been converted to a Little Chef.In the late 2000s, plans were announced to upgrade the A1 between Dishforth and Leeming Bar to a motorway. Consequently, this would result in the demise of Rainton Services. In early 2009, the southbound branch was compulsorily purchased and was demolished shortly prior to the first phase of the roadworks. The northbound Little Chef closed in December 2009, along with its accompanying facilities. that was closed in 2009. lthough the building on the southbound side was demolished, the former restaurant's car park and associated minimilk lampposts were surprisingly retained, serving as the only remaining evidence of there ever being a Little Chef at the site. The lamppost was later removed by 2018, while the former car park is now wasteland. In contemporary folklore the site is believed to be haunted, with multiple sightings of the previous Manger, Hazel, seen since the removal of the lamppost in 2018.

== See also ==
- Listed buildings in Rainton with Newby
