= Listed buildings in Rainton with Newby =

Rainton with Newby is a civil parish in the county of North Yorkshire, England. It contains 14 listed buildings that are recorded in the National Heritage List for England. Of these, one is listed at Grade I, the highest of the three grades, and the others are at Grade II, the lowest grade. The parish contains the village of Rainton and the surrounding area. The most important building in the parish is the former country house Baldersby Park House, later a school, which is listed together with associated structures in the gardens and grounds. The other listed buildings are in the village, and consist of houses, farmhouses, and a dovecote and attached barn.

== Key ==
Grade	Criteria
I	Buildings of exceptional interest, sometimes considered to be internationally important
II	Buildings of national importance and special interest

== Buildings ==
Name and location	Photograph	Date	Notes	Grade
Dovecote and adjoining barn 54.17258°N 1.43395°W		17th century (probable)	The barn is in stone with quoins, a pantile roof with stone coping and a shaped kneeler on the left. There are three bays, and it contains a doorway with a quoined surround, a buttress, windows and slit vents. The added dovecote is in stone and cobbles, and has a shallow pointed pantile roof with a finial. It has a square plan, two storeys and one bay, and contains doorways, and pigeon holes under the eaves.	II
Baldersby Park House; 54.18086°N 1.40719°W		1718–21	A country house, later a school, in stone with a Westmorland slate roof, and in Palladian style. There are two storeys, a square main block with a front of five bays, linked by wings to recessed three-bay pavilions. In the centre of the main block are four giant attached fluted Ionic columns carrying an entablature with a dentilled triangular pediment containing scrolled foliage, and deep eaves. There is a modillion eaves cornice, and a parapet with a balustrade. The doorway has pilasters, an entablature, and a radial fanlight with a moulded keystone. The windows are sashes, those on the ground floor with architraves and triangular pediments, and in the upper floor with eared and shouldered architraves. In the centre of the right return is a doorway with Ionic columns, and alternate rusticated and plain blocks, and a triangular pediment.	I
Surround to fish ponds and islands, Baldersby Park; 54.17797°N 1.40594°W		Early 18th century	The fish pond is to the south of Baldersby Park House. Its surround is in sandstone and cobble, and the pond is lined with cobble. It extends for about 250 metres (820 ft) and is about 20 metres (66 ft) in width. The pond contains the remains of two D-shaped islands with a narrow channel between.	II
Obelisk south of Baldersby Park House; 54.17660°N 1.40560°W		1733 (probable)	The obelisk is in stone and has a square base about 2.5 metres (8 ft 2 in) wide, and a two-stage plinth. The shaft is about 7 metres (23 ft) in height.	II
Obelisk west of Baldersby Park House; 54.18203°N 1.41694°W		1733 (probable)	The obelisk is in stone, and about 12 metres (39 ft) in height. It has a square base about 3.5 metres (11 ft) wide, a two-stage plinth with moulded chamfers about 2.5 metres (8 ft 2 in) in height, and a tall shaft in diminishing courses.	II
Pavilion and wall with balustrade, Baldersby Park House; 54.18062°N 1.40798°W	—	Early to mid-18th century	The pavilion is in stone with a lead roof, one storey and three bays. It is open on the garden side, with Tuscan columns distyle in antis carrying a round-arched arcade with a keystone band. Above is a dentilled cornice and a parapet, and the rear wall has a blind arcade. The wall carrying a coped balustrade encloses two sides of a sunken garden. It contains solid piers at intervals, and has raised corner platforms reached by curved steps.	II
Surround to reservoir west of Baldersby Park House; 54.18052°N 1.41377°W	—	18th century	The reservoir surround is in sandstone, and the reservoir is circular in plan, with a diameter of about 10 metres (33 ft). There is a wide retaining bank lined with stone, and a later concrete tank is attached to the south side.	II
Surrounds to two pools and fountains south of Baldersby Park House; 54.18085°N 1.40682°W	—	18th century (probable)	The pools are circular with a diameter of about 2 metres (6 ft 7 in). The surrounds are in stone, about 40 centimetres (16 in) in height, with a rolled rim. The fountains bases are in the form of rock outcrops, and are about 75 centimetres (30 in) in height.	II
Church Lane Farmhouse; 54.17281°N 1.43476°W	—	Mid 18th century	The farmhouse is in stone, with quoins, and a pantile roof with stone gable coping and shaped kneelers. There are two storeys, a double depth plan, five bays, and a single-storey rear extension. On the front are three doorways, two blocked, and the windows are horizontally-sliding sashes.	II
Grange Farm House; 54.17187°N 1.43461°W	—	Late 18th century	The farmhouse is in stone, and has a swept pantile roof with stone coping. There are two storeys and three bays, and a rear wing. On the front is a Doric doorcase with attached columns and a plain entablature, and a doorway with an elliptical fanlight and imposts. This is flanked by canted bay windows, and to the left is a sash window with an architrave and a rusticated lintel. The upper floor contains sash windows.	II
The Old Smithy; 54.17205°N 1.43342°W	—	Late 18th century	A house and a smithy, later incorporated into the house. It is in stone with a pantile roof. The house has two storeys and three bays. In the centre is a doorway, and the windows are sashes. To the right, the former smithy has one storey.	II
Websters Farm Cottage; 54.17235°N 1.43363°W	—	Late 18th century	The house is in stone, and has a pantile roof with stone coping and shaped kneelers. There are two storeys, a double depth plan, and two bays. The central doorway has an arched surround, with a fanlight, decorative banding and a keystone. The windows are sashes in architraves.	II
Village Farm House; 54.17055°N 1.43517°W	—	Early 19th century	The farmhouse is in stone, with quoins, and a pantile roof with stone coping. There are two storeys and three bays. The central doorway has Doric pilasters, a rectangular fanlight and a plain entablature. The windows are sashes in architraves, those in the ground floor with incised lintels.	II
Tennis court north of Baldersby Park House; 54.18146°N 1.40719°W	—	Mid to late 19th century	The tennis court is in red and brown brick with a hipped Westmorland slate roof. There are two storeys and three bays, and a taller single-storey hall four bays deep at the rear. At the front are giant pilaster strips, and a central recessed round arch containing the doorway with a flat soldier arch. The outer bays contain sash windows with cambered brick gauged arches. The front of the hall has three blind round arches, and a stepped gable with stone coping.	II
