= Listed buildings in Topcliffe, North Yorkshire =

Topcliffe is a civil parish in the county of North Yorkshire, England. It contains 18 listed buildings that are recorded in the National Heritage List for England. Of these, one is listed at Grade II*, the middle of the three grades, and the others are at Grade II, the lowest grade. The parish contains the village of Topcliffe and the surrounding countryside. Most of the listed buildings are houses, cottages and farmhouses, and the others include a church and a chapel, a cross base, a former watermill, a dovecote, a former school and a milepost.

== Key ==
Grade	Criteria
II*	Particularly important buildings of more than special interest
II	Buildings of national importance and special interest

== Buildings ==
Name and location	Photograph	Date	Notes	Grade
St Columba's Church; 54.17857°N 1.38924°W		Early 14th century	The oldest part of the church is the east window of the chancel, with the rest rebuilt in 1855 by G. T. Andrews, and with further alterations in 1894 and 1908. The church is built in stone with a Westmorland slate roof, and consists of a nave and chancel under a continuous roof, a south porch, a north aisle with a vestry, and a west tower. The tower has three stages, a plinth, angle buttresses, bands, a south clock face with a moulded surround, two-light bell openings with hood moulds, corbelled eaves, and an embattled parapet with eight crocketed pinnacles.	II*
Cross base 54.17787°N 1.38821°W		Medieval	The cross base in Long Street is in stone and has a square plan. It stands on three steps and has a socket for a shaft.	II
The Old Tolbooth; 54.17804°N 1.38720°W		17th century	The house is in stone with quoins and a stone slate roof. There are two storeys and three bays. On the front are two doorways with plain lintels, and a similar doorway on the right return. The upper floor contains casement windows with wedge lintels, and at the rear a flight of 13 steps with a coped parapet leads up to a doorway with a wedge lintel.	II
Ye Old Golden Lion Cottage; 54.17880°N 1.38737°W	—	Early 18th century	A public house, later a private house, it is rendered, and has an eaves band, and a pantile roof with rendered coping to the left gable. There are two storeys and four bays. On the front is a doorway with two canted bay windows to the left, and the other windows are casements.	II
Hall Farmhouse; 54.17924°N 1.38760°W		Mid-18th century	The house is in red brick with a floor band, a stepped eaves band, and a pantile roof. There are two storeys and five bays. Steps lead up to a doorway with a fanlight, the windows are sashes, and all the openings have flat brick arches.	II
The Old Post House; 54.17906°N 1.38784°W		Mid-18th century	The house, at one time a Post Office, is stuccoed, and has a floor band, an eaves band, and a pantile roof with shaped kneelers and stone coping. There are two storeys and two bays. The central doorway has a fanlight, to its right is a shop window with a plinth, a frieze and a cornice, and the other windows are sashes.	II
Topcliffe Mill; 54.18159°N 1.39385°W		Mid-18th century	A watermill converted for residential use, in red brick and stone with a pantile roof. The main block has four storeys and three bays, to the right is a three-storey gabled bay, and a projecting two-storey bay. On the left gable is a three-story outshut. The doorways and the windows, which are casements, have elliptical-arched heads.	II
Topcliffe Mill House; 54.18184°N 1.39378°W		Mid-18th century	The house is in red brick, and has a pantile roof with shaped kneelers and stone coping. There are three storeys and three bays, and a lower two-storey single-bay wing projecting on the right. The doorway has reeded pilasters, a frieze, a dentilled cornice and a pediment. Apart from two casement windows on the top floor, the windows are sashes, and most of the windows have segmental brick arches. The windows in the wing are casements.	II
Walkers Ground; 54.17900°N 1.38840°W	—	Mid-18th century	The house is in red brick on a plinth, with quoins on the right, and a tile roof with a shaped kneeler and stone coping on the right. The central doorway has a plain surround, a keystone, and a cornice on brackets. It is flanked by canted bay windows with friezes and cornices, and to the left is a segmental passage entry. The upper floor contains sash windows.	II
Dovecote east of Hall Farmhouse; 54.17926°N 1.38697°W		Late 18th century	The dovecote has been converted for residential use. It is in red brick, and has a pantile roof with raised brick gables and stone kneelers. There are two storeys and a square plan. The south front has a doorway and a horizontally sliding sash window to the left. The east front has a window, above which is a former loft doorway, and on both the east and west fronts are perching ledges.	II
The Old School; 54.17886°N 1.38934°W		1812	The former school is in stone, and has a stone slate roof with shaped kneelers and stone coping. There is one storey and three bays. In the centre is a gabled porch, and a doorway with a chamfered surround and a four-centred arched head, and above is an inscription and the date. The porch is flanked by three-light chamfered mullioned windows with hood moulds, and on the right return is a similar window and a blocked lancet window above.	II
Duart and the house to the right 54.17918°N 1.38790°W	—	Early 19th century	A pair of houses in red brick that have a pantile roof with shaped kneelers and stone coping. There are two storeys and three bays. On the front are two doorways with pilasters, a frieze and a cornice. The windows are sashes with flat brick arches.	II
Jasmine Cottage; 54.17889°N 1.38741°W	—	Early 19th century	The house is in red brick with a pantile roof. There are two storeys and two bays. The doorway is in the centre, the windows are horizontally sliding sashes, and the ground floor openings have flat brick arches.	II
Salmon Hall; 54.18289°N 1.40954°W	—	Early 19th century	The farmhouse is in red brick, with a stepped eaves band, and a pantile roof with shaped kneelers and stone coping. There are two storeys and three bays. The central doorway has a Doric surround, a cornice and a flat brick arch. The windows are sashes with flat stuccoed arches.	II
The Mount; 54.17927°N 1.38865°W	—	Early 19th century	The house is in red brick on a plinth, with a sill band and a tile roof. There are three storeys and three bays. The central doorway has a Doric surround, with pilasters, a frieze and a cornice, and to the right is a round-arched doorway. The windows are casements with stuccoed flat arches.	II
The Old Vicarage; 54.17976°N 1.38744°W	—	1829	The house is in stone at the front and in red brick elsewhere, and has a pantile roof. There are two storeys, three bays, and a small recessed addition on the left. The doorway has Doric columns, a fanlight, an initialled and dated lintel, and a cornice. All the windows are horizontally sliding sashes with edge lintels.	II
Wesleyan Chapel; 54.17814°N 1.38882°W		1840	The chapel is in red brick with stone dressings, a Welsh slate roof, and a pedimented gable with stone coping and ball finials. There are two storeys and a front of three bays. In the centre is a doorway with a Doric surround, a fanlight and a pediment. The windows are sashes with round heads, margin lights, impost bands, moulded archivolts and keystones. Above is an eaves band and an inscribed and dated panel.	II
Milepost; 54.18201°N 1.38722°W		Late 19th century	The milepost on the west side of the A167 road is in cast iron. It has a triangular plan and a sloping top. On the top is the distance to London, on the left side is the distance to Northallerton, and on the right side to Boroughbridge, the names of the last two towns abbreviated.	II
