= Listed buildings in Dalton, east North Yorkshire =

Dalton is a civil parish in the county of North Yorkshire, England. It contains two listed buildings that are recorded in the National Heritage List for England. Of these, one is listed at Grade II*, the middle of the three grades, and the other is at Grade II, the lowest grade. The parish contains the village of Dalton and the surrounding countryside, and the listed buildings consist of a farmhouse and a church.

== Key ==
Grade	Criteria
II*	Particularly important buildings of more than special interest
II	Buildings of national importance and special interest

== Buildings ==
Name and location	Photograph	Date	Notes	Grade
Paradise Farmhouse; 54.18878°N 1.34420°W	—	Late 18th century	The farmhouse is in red brick, and has a machine tile roof with stone coping and shaped kneelers. There are two storeys and three bays. In the centre is a trellis porch, and a doorway with a flat arch and a fanlight. The windows are sashes with flat brick arches.	II
St John the Evangelist's Church; 54.18080°N 1.33408°W		1868	The church, designed by William Butterfield, is in stone with a Welsh slate roof, and it consists of a nave with a south porch, a chancel with a south transept and a north vestry, and a slim west bellcote tower. The tower contains a lancet window with a hood mould, and a sill band. The upper stage, which is corbelled inwards, has a clock face, and it rises to become octagonal with four lancet bell openings. Above this is an eaves band and a spirelet. The windows in the body of the church are cusped lancets. Inside, there is much polychromatic decoration.	II*
