= Tāmairangi =

Ngāti Ira leader (died c. 1828)

Tāmairangi (died c. 1828) was a New Zealand tribal leader of the Ngāti Ira and Ngāti Kuia iwi. She was known for her great mana (authority and influence). During the 1820s Musket Wars, she and her children survived attacks on the Ngāti Ira people by other iwi. The Ngāti Toa chief Te Rangihaeata took her and her family under his protection for a period after being impressed by a waiata (song) Tāmairangi composed and sang. Tāmairangi was killed around 1828, although historic accounts differ as to the circumstances of her death.

== Biography ==
Tāmairangi grew up on Arapawa Island in the Cook Strait, and was descended from Ngāti Ira chief Māhanga-pūhua. She married the Ngāti Ira chief Whanake at Porirua and they had at least two children, including Te Kēkerengū who himself became a chief of the Ngāti Ira iwi. Tāmairangi was seen as a woman of great mana; it was reported that she travelled on a litter between villages carried by slaves, and that she carried a carved taiaha.

In the 1820s, the Ngāti Toa, Ngāti Tama and Ngāti Mutunga iwi moved into the Wellington region as part of the Musket Wars. Around 1824, Ngāti Mutunga attacked the Ngāti Ira people, resulting in numerous deaths. Tāmairangi and her children, together with other survivors, were able to escape to the island of Tapu Te Ranga in Island Bay, where they established a defensive pā. When they were attacked on the island, Tāmairangi and her children escaped by canoe to Rimurapa and then to Ōhariu, where they were captured.

Tāmairangi asked their Ngāti Mutunga captors for permission to farewell her iwi and land, which was granted. She sang a waiata of her own composition, about the beauty of the land. Ngāti Toa chief Te Rangihaeata was impressed by her talent, and offered to take her and her children to Kapiti Island under his own protection.

Tāmairangi and her children lived at Kapiti Island for some years; however, they were forced to leave after rumours were spread that Te Kēkerengū had abused Te Rangihaeata's hospitality by forming a relationship with one of his wives. They escaped by canoe to Arapawa Island, and then further south.

Tāmairangi, Te Kēkerengū and other members of their iwi were reportedly killed soon after these events, in around 1828, but accounts differ as to the location and cause of their deaths. Most accounts suggest they were killed by Ngāi Tahu. Some accounts say they were killed at the place subsequently called Kekerengu after Tāmairangi's son. Some of Tāmairangi and Te Kēkerengū's descendants survived in the Wairarapa following these events, although having lost their tribal lands.

== Legacy ==
In 1895, scholar Elsdon Best said that Tāmairangi "was evidently a very superior woman, and many tales are still told of her noble qualities and far-reaching mana".

A sandbank in Porirua Harbour was known as Te Whata-kai-a-Tāmairangi (the storehouse of Tāmairangi). The Evening Post in 1963 suggested that a storehouse here was "used exclusively for keeping human flesh", but historian Angela Ballara wrote in 1990 that the sandbank was "probably a source of shellfish".

Eileen Duggan wrote a poem titled "Tamarangi" about her escape from Ngāti Mutunga, published in the New Zealand Times in 1926.
