= Eldmire with Crakehill =

Civil parish in North Yorkshire, England

Coordinates: 54.156°N 1.344°W

- Civil parish
- Population: 30
- OS grid reference: SE428735
- Civil parish: Eldmire with Crakehill
- Unitary authority: North Yorkshire
- Ceremonial county: North Yorkshire
- Region: Yorkshire and the Humber
- Country: England
- Sovereign state: United Kingdom
- Post town: THIRSK
- Postcode district: YO7
- Police: North Yorkshire
- Fire: North Yorkshire
- Ambulance: Yorkshire
- UK Parliament: Thirsk and Malton

Eldmire with Crakehill is a civil parish in the county of North Yorkshire, England. The population of the parish was estimated at 30 in 2013.

There is no village in the parish: it consists of a number of scattered houses and farms, including the hamlets of Eldmire and Crakehill, on the east bank of the River Swale. Crakehill was mentioned in Domesday Book (as Crecala). It was joined with the manor of Eldmire (also spelt Elmire) from at least the early 14th century. The two settlements formed a township in the ancient parish of Topcliffe and became a separate civil parish in 1866.

From 1974 to 2023 it was part of the Hambleton District and is now administered by the unitary North Yorkshire Council.
