= Kekerengu River =

Coordinates: 42°00′S 174°01′E

Location
- Country: New Zealand

Physical characteristics
- Source
  - location: Inland Kaikōura Range
- Mouth
  - location: Pacific Ocean
- Length: 14 km (8.7 mi)

The Kekerengu River (often spelt Kekerangu) is a river of New Zealand's northeastern South Island. It flows mainly through the area of rough hill country immediately to the north of the end of the Seaward Kaikōura Range, reaching the Pacific Ocean at Kekerengu, a small settlement halfway between the township of Ward and the mouth of the Waiau Toa / Clarence River.

== See also ==
- List of rivers of New Zealand
