= St Columba's Church, Topcliffe =

Church in North Yorkshire, England

Coordinates: 54.178°N 1.388°W

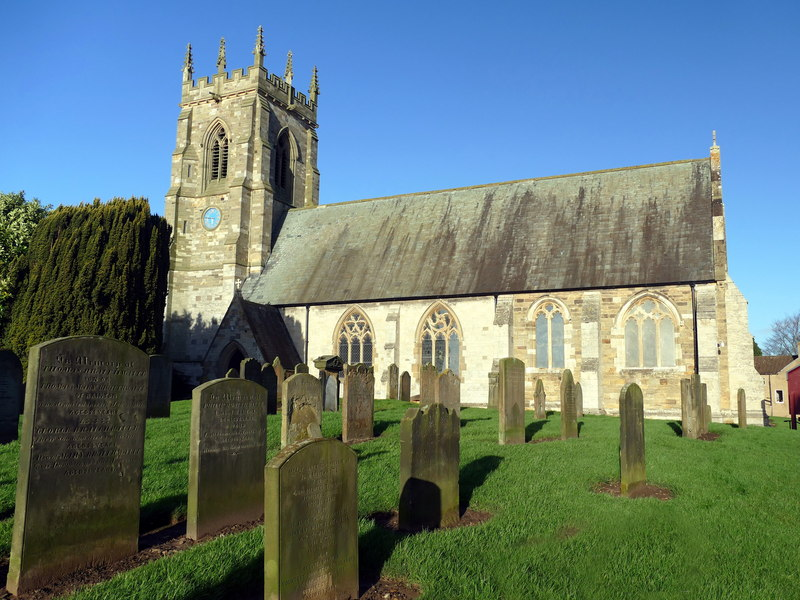
The church, in 2015

St Columba's Church is the parish church of Topcliffe, North Yorkshire, a village in England.

The church was built in the early 13th century, from which period the east wall of the chancel, including the east window, survives. Much of the building was rebuilt in the early 14th century, from which time the lower part of the south wall of the chancel survives, while a tower was added in the 15th century. In 1855 the remainder of the building was rebuilt by George Townsend Andrews, and there were further alterations in 1894 and 1908. The church was grade II* listed in 1966.

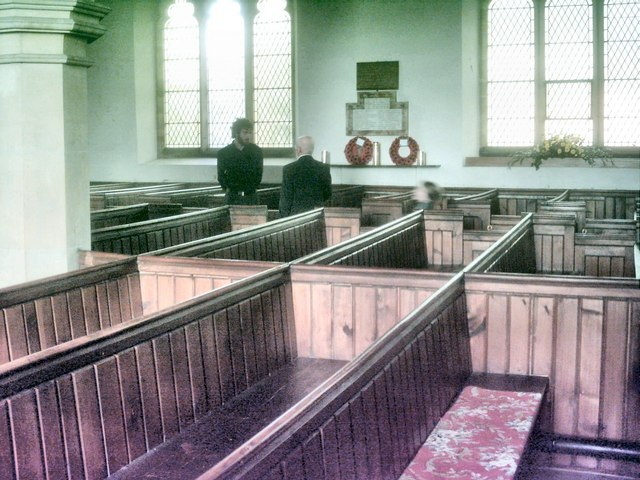
Pews in the nave

The church is built of stone with a Westmorland slate roof, and consists of a nave and chancel under a continuous roof, a south porch, a north aisle with a vestry, and a west tower. The tower has three stages, a plinth, angle buttresses, bands, a south clock face with a moulded surround, two-light bell openings with hood moulds, corbelled eaves, and an embattled parapet with eight crocketed pinnacles. Inside, there are an early-14th century aumbry, piscina and sedilia. The south window of the chancel has stained glass designed by Edward Burne-Jones, while the nave has stained glass by Charles Eamer Kempe. There is a brass memorial to Thomas de Topcliffe, dating from the 1390s.

== See also ==
- Grade II* listed churches in North Yorkshire (district)
- Listed buildings in Topcliffe, North Yorkshire
