= Timeline of first images of Earth from space =

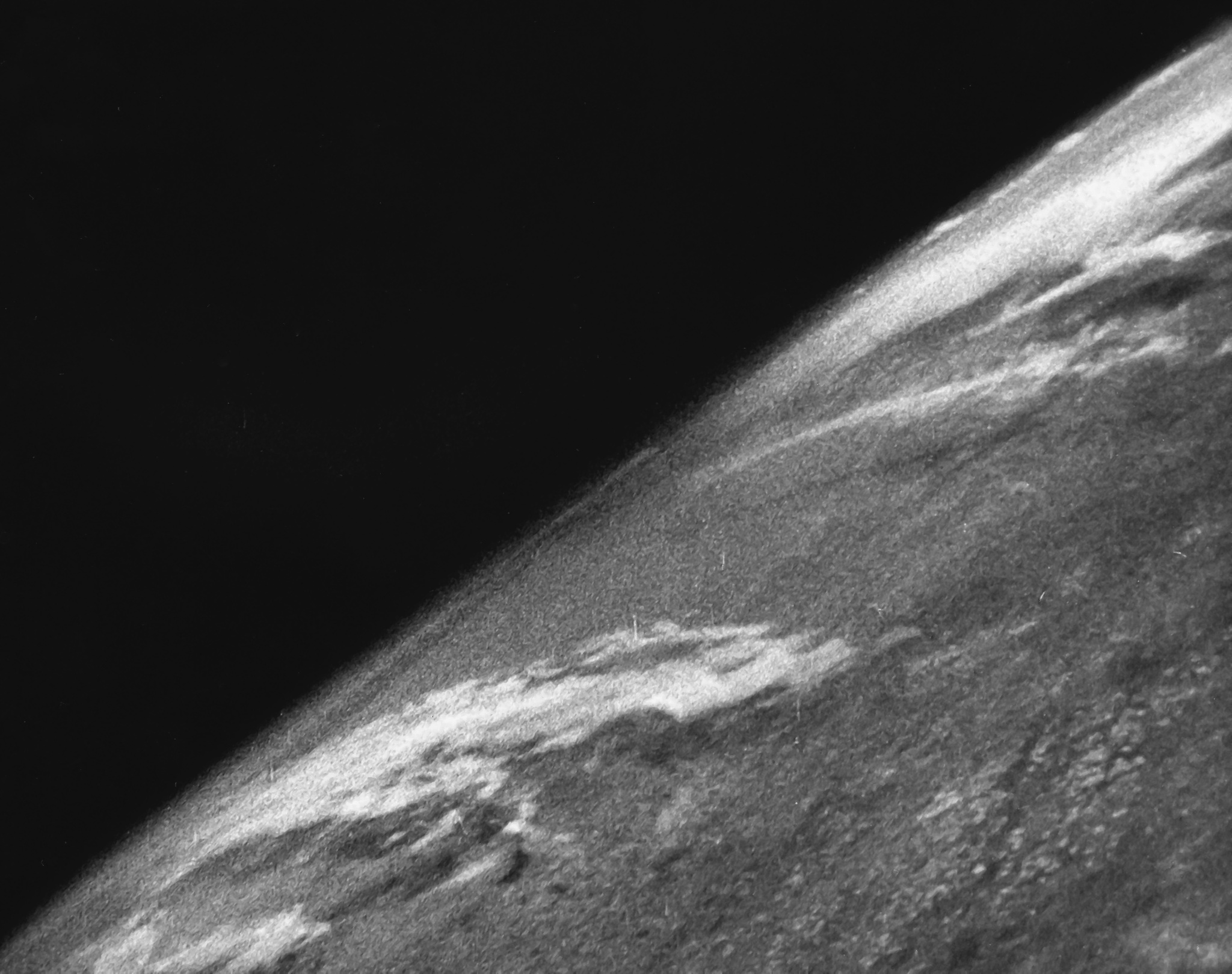
The first photograph of Earth from outer space, taken on a V-2 flight on October 24, 1946.

Photography and other imagery of planet Earth from outer space (Note: Within the context of this timeline, outer space is considered as starting at the Kármán line, 100 kilometres (62 miles) above mean sea level (AMSL).) started in the 1940s. Initially the images were taken from rockets in suborbital flight, subsequently from satellites around Earth, and eventually from spacecraft beyond Earth's orbit. (Note: The inclusion criterion for this timeline is being a first in terms of the conditions in which the image was taken.)

== Timeline ==
Each section on the following timeline refers to a craft or a mission.

1. === V-2 ===
  1. October 24, 1946
    First images of Earth from outer space, flight monitoring continuous imaging, resulting in a timelapse-movie reel. Not published as Earth observation images until 1950. Taken by the V-2 No. 13 suborbital spaceflight, the eighth successful US spaceflight and one of the first over-all.
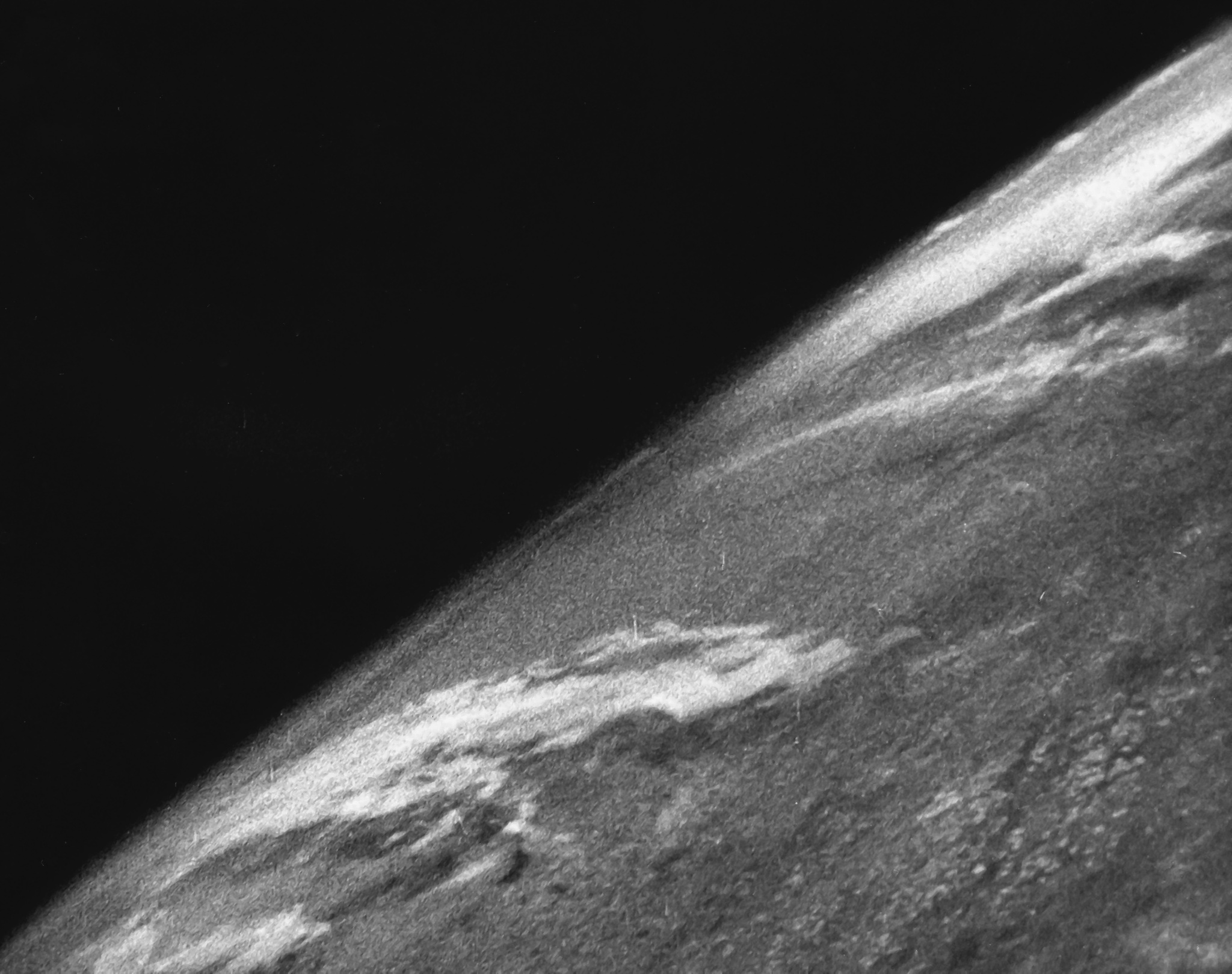
  2. March 7, 1947
    First dedicated and first published Earth observation images from outer space, first published on March 25, 1947.
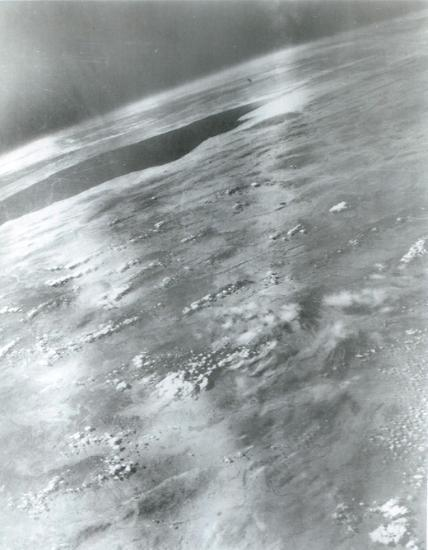
  3. July 26, 1948
    First prepared wide-angle panorama of Earth from outer space.
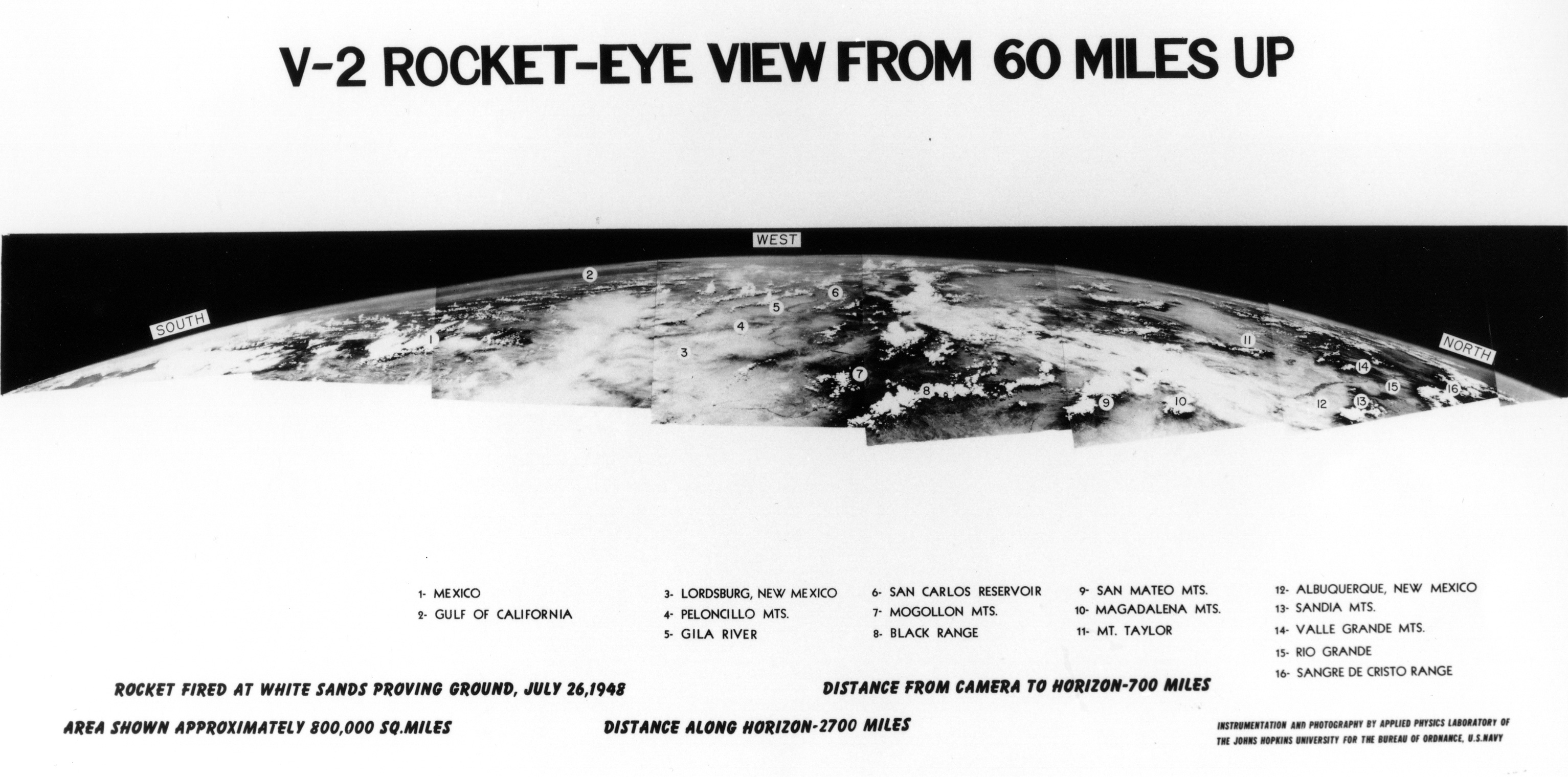
2. === Aerobee AJ10-24 RTV-N-10b ===
  1. October 5, 1954
    The first color image from space as part in the left corner of this first color photomosaic of Earth from space, composed of 117 images taken from an altitude of 100 miles (160 km).
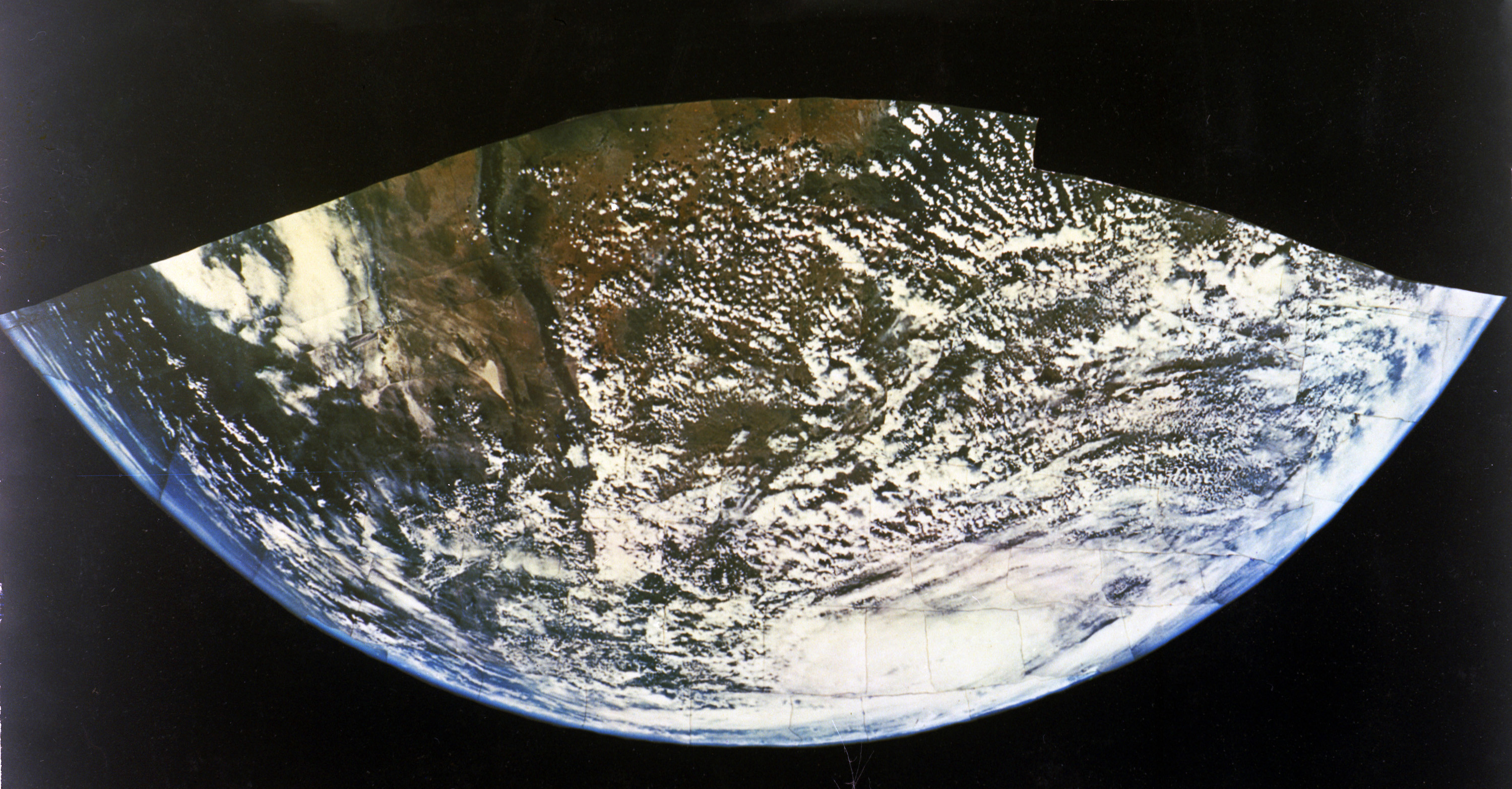
3. === Vanguard 2 ===
  1. February–March 1959
    First attempt of a scanner, in which a single photocell mounted at the focus of telescope would scan Earth due to the satellite movement; resulting images were poor.
4. === Explorer 6 ===
  1. August 14, 1959
    First image of Earth from orbit, showing a sunlit area of the Central Pacific Ocean and its cloud cover.
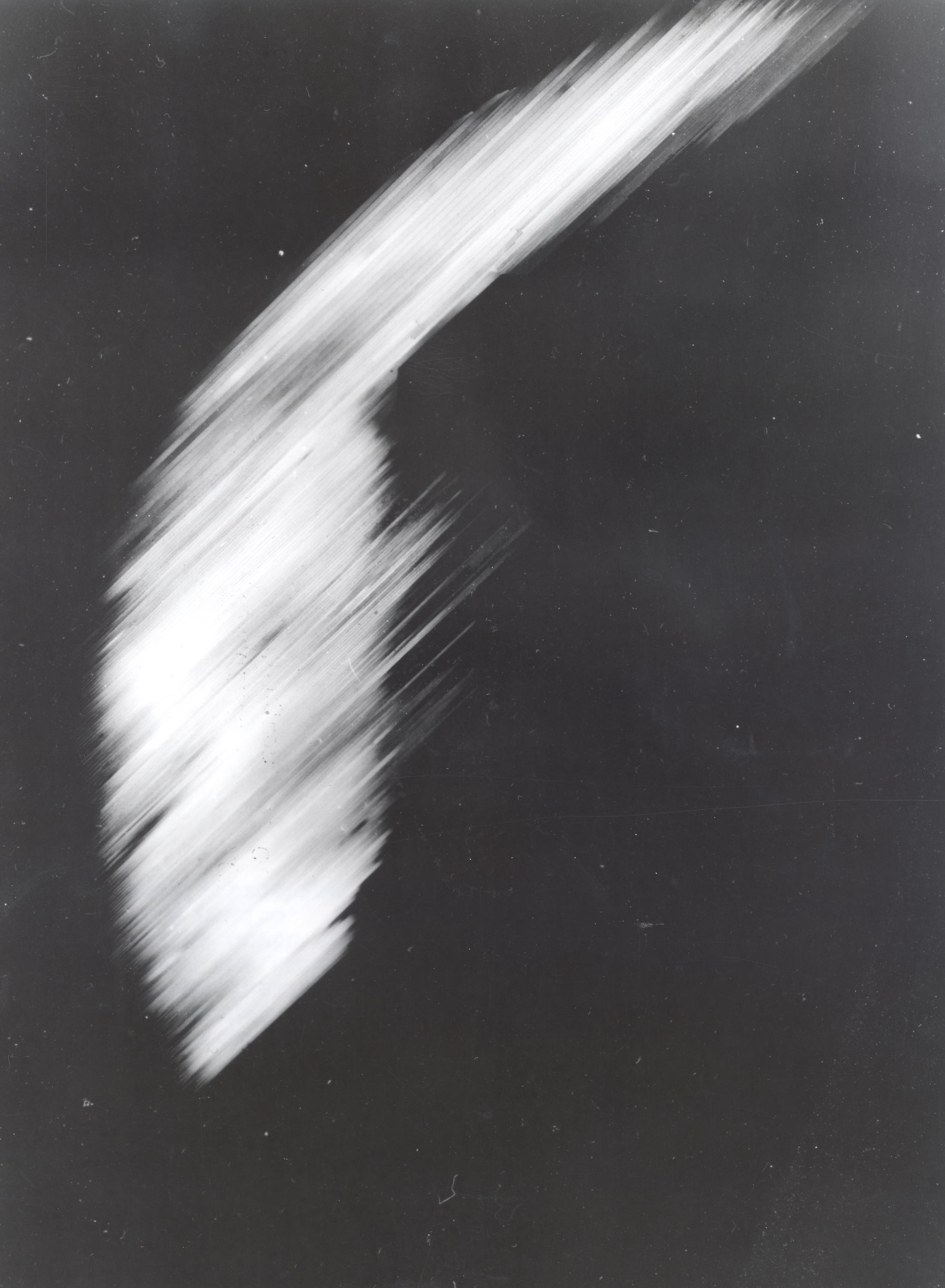
5. === Explorer 7 ===
  1. 1959
    The first "coarse maps of the solar radiation reflected by the Earth and the infrared radiation emitted by the Earth", from a mission launched on October 13, 1959.
6. === TIROS-1 ===
  1. 1960
    First television image of Earth from space and first weather satellite picture.
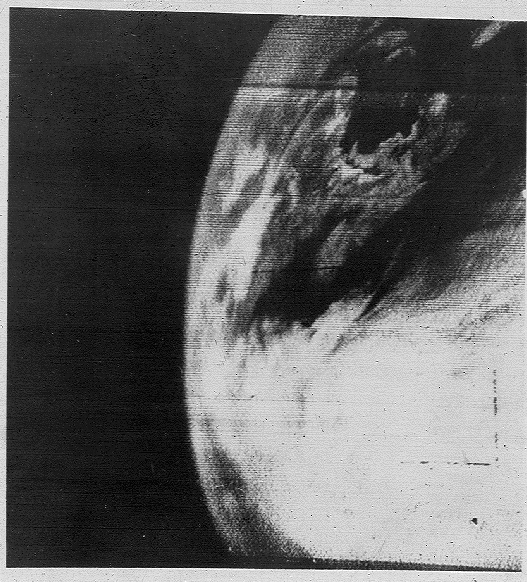
7. === CORONA ===
  1. August 18, 1960
    "First space-based Earth observation system"; its first successful mission was Discoverer 14 on 19 August 1960 with the recovery of photographic film from an orbiting satellite.
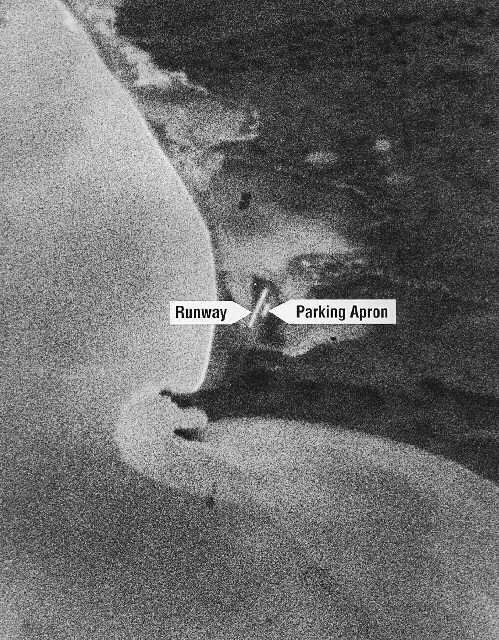
8. === Vostok 2 ===
  1. August 6, 1961
    First image, color images and movie of Earth from space taken by a person, by cosmonaut Gherman Titov – the first photographer from space.
    External image
    - image icon
9. === KH-7 Gambit ===
  1. 1963
    First high-resolution (sub-meter spatial resolution) satellite photography (classified).
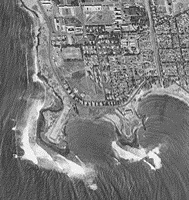
10. === Quill ===
  1. 1964
    First radar images of Earth from space, using a synthetic aperture radar (SAR). This shows part of Richmond, Virginia.
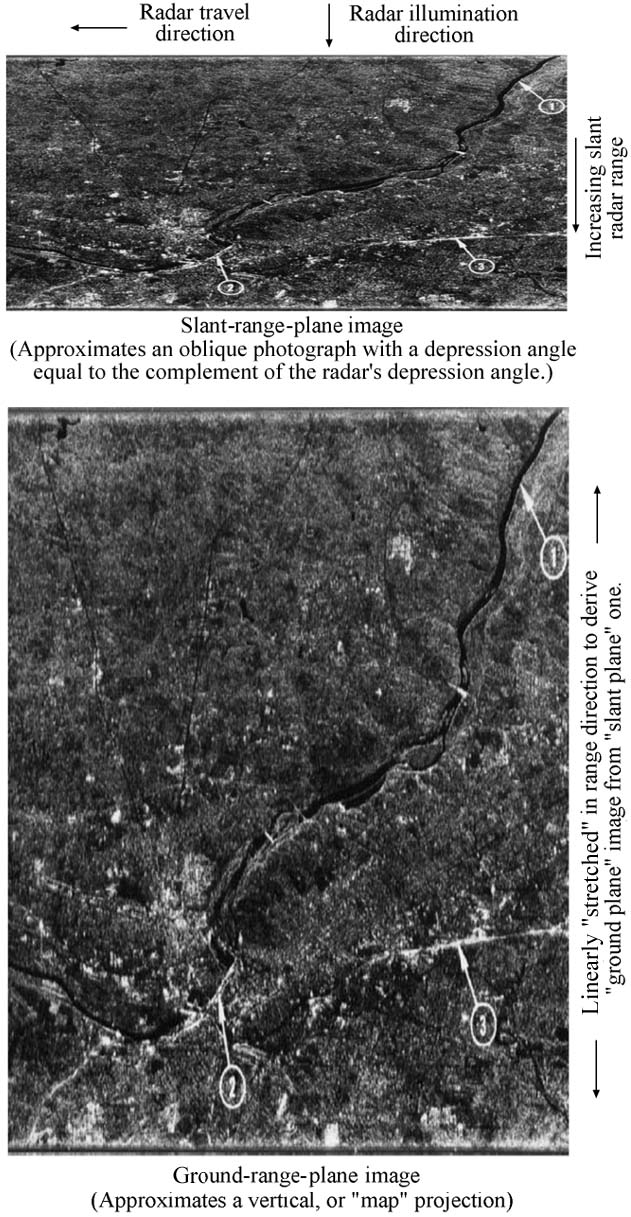
11. === Voskhod 2 ===
  1. March 18, 1965
    First image and movie of Earth with a human (Alexei Leonov) floating in space (the first ever EVA).
    See article
  2. March 18, 1965
    First drawing of Earth from space and art made in space (by Leonov, the first artist in space).
    External image
    - image icon
12. === Molniya 1–3 ===
  1. May 30, 1966
    First full-disk pictures of the Earth, published in Review of Popular Astronomy July–August.
    External image
    - image icon
13. === Lunar Orbiter 1 ===
  1. August 23, 1966
    First image of Earth while orbiting another astronomical object (the Moon) and first picture of both Earth and the Moon from space. The image (frame 1102; image 102 of Lunar Orbiter 1) consists of three parts h1-h3. Since its original publication its raw analog data has been used to digitally produce the image (including its wide angle version) in higher resolution (see) and clarity (see).
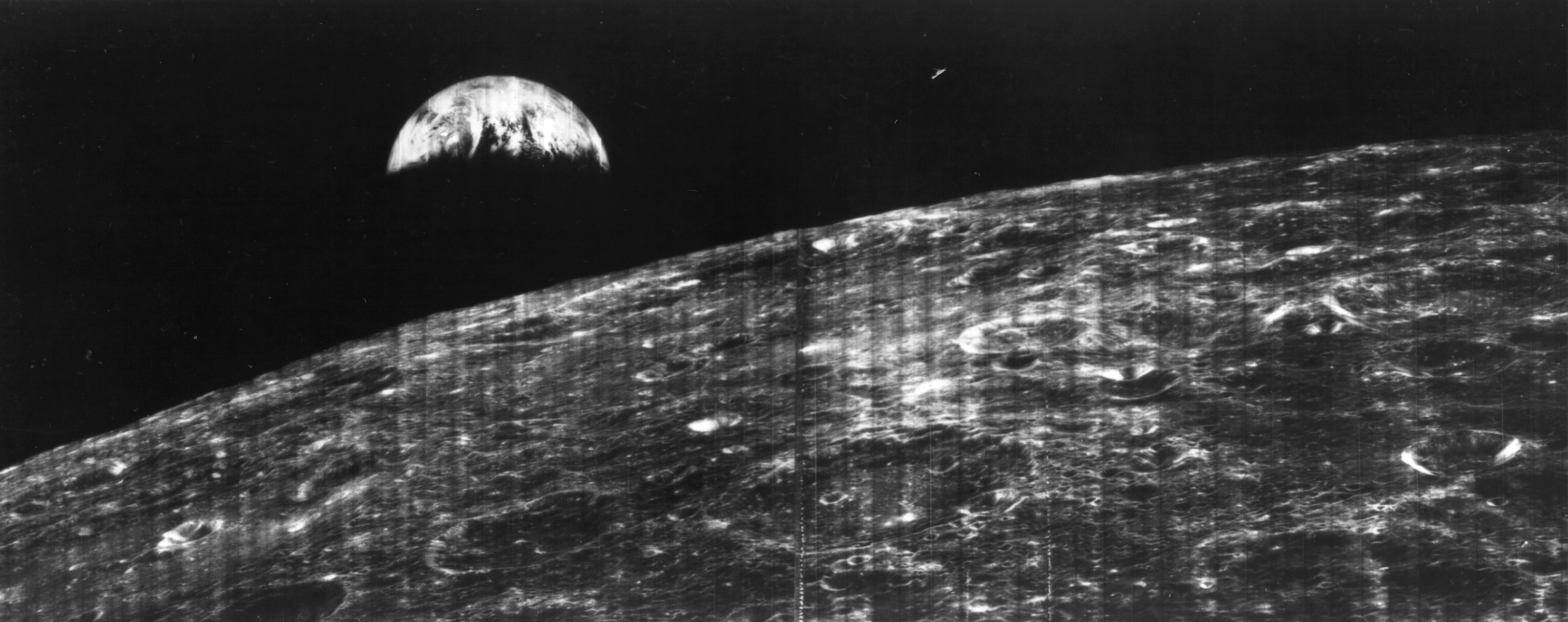
14. === ATS-1 ===
  1. December 11, 1966
    First picture of both Earth and the Moon from the Earth's orbit.
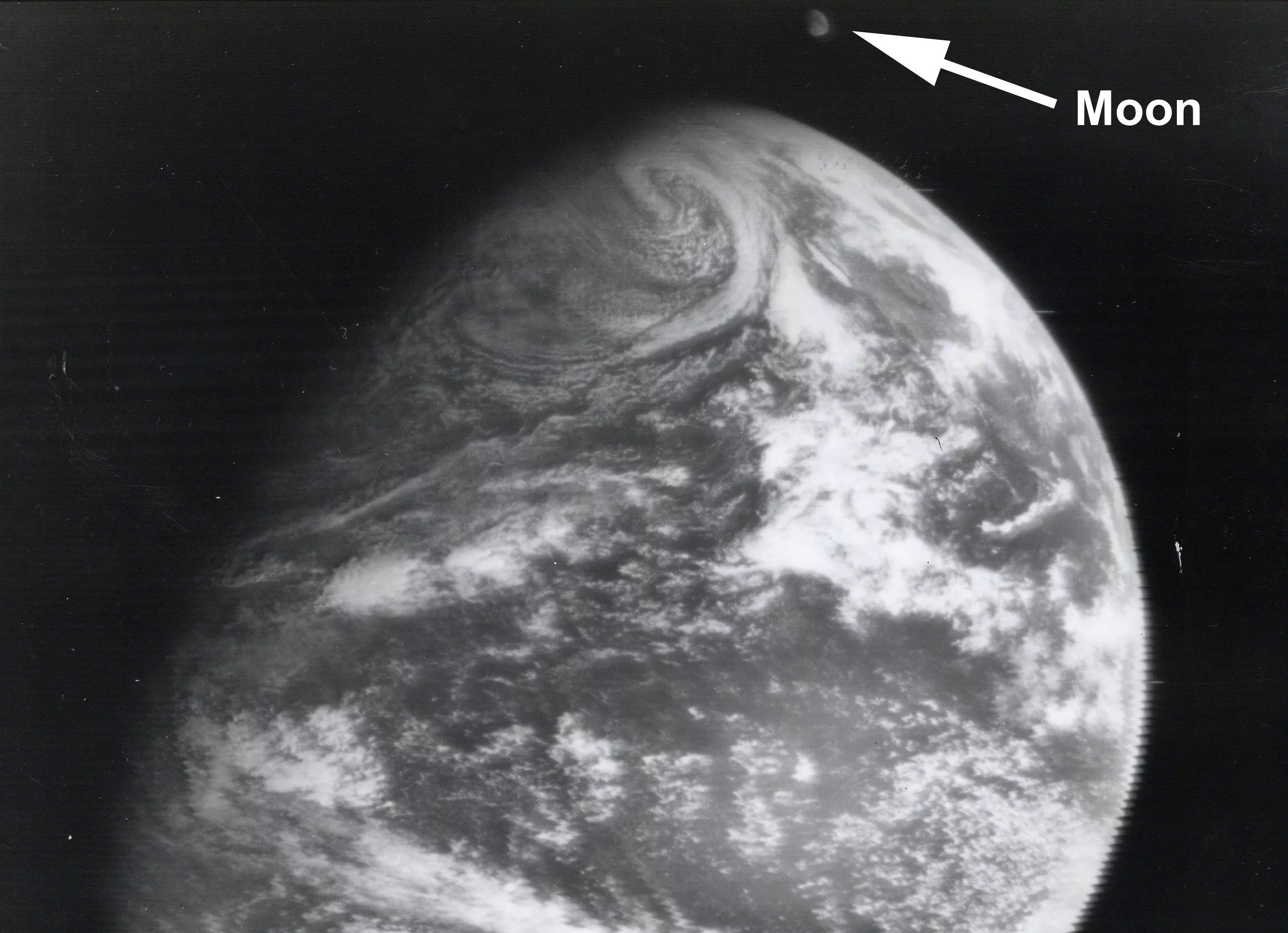
  2. December 11, 1966
    First full-disk pictures of the Earth from a geostationary orbit.
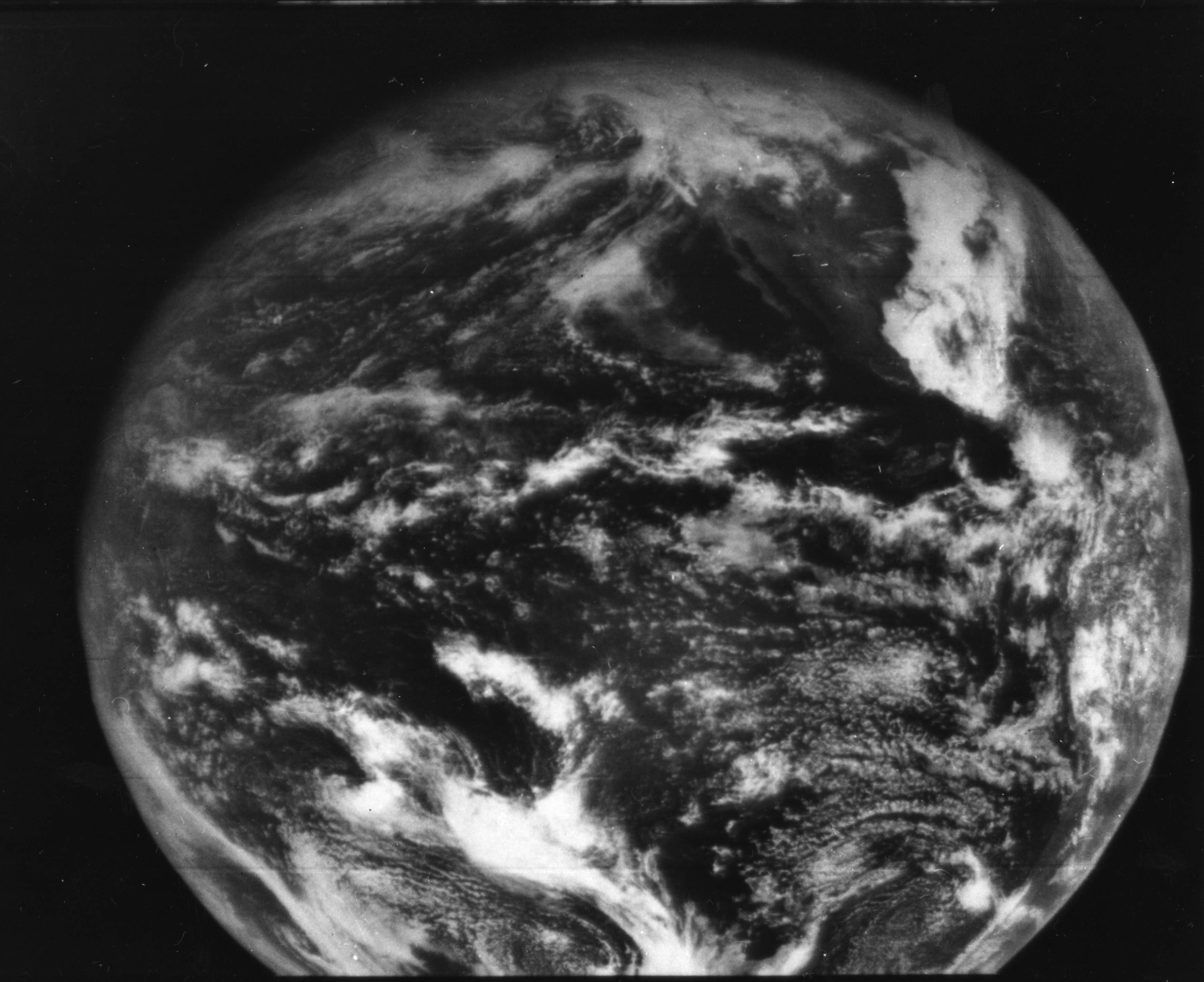
  3. January 1967
    First movie of Earth from space made without a human camera operator (contrast to Titov's 1961 movie).
15. === Surveyor 3 ===
  1. April 24, 1967
    First images showing both sunset and sunrise over Earth at the same time, taken from the Moon's surface during a solar eclipse caused by Earth (rather than the Moon).
  2. April 30, 1967
    First color image of Earth from the surface of another astronomical object, from the Moon's surface.
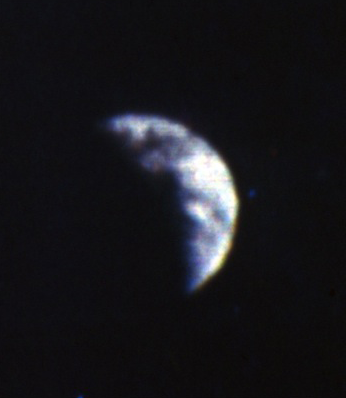
16. === DODGE ===
  1. September 20, 1967 (released November 10)
    First full-disk black-and-white filtered color picture of the Earth.
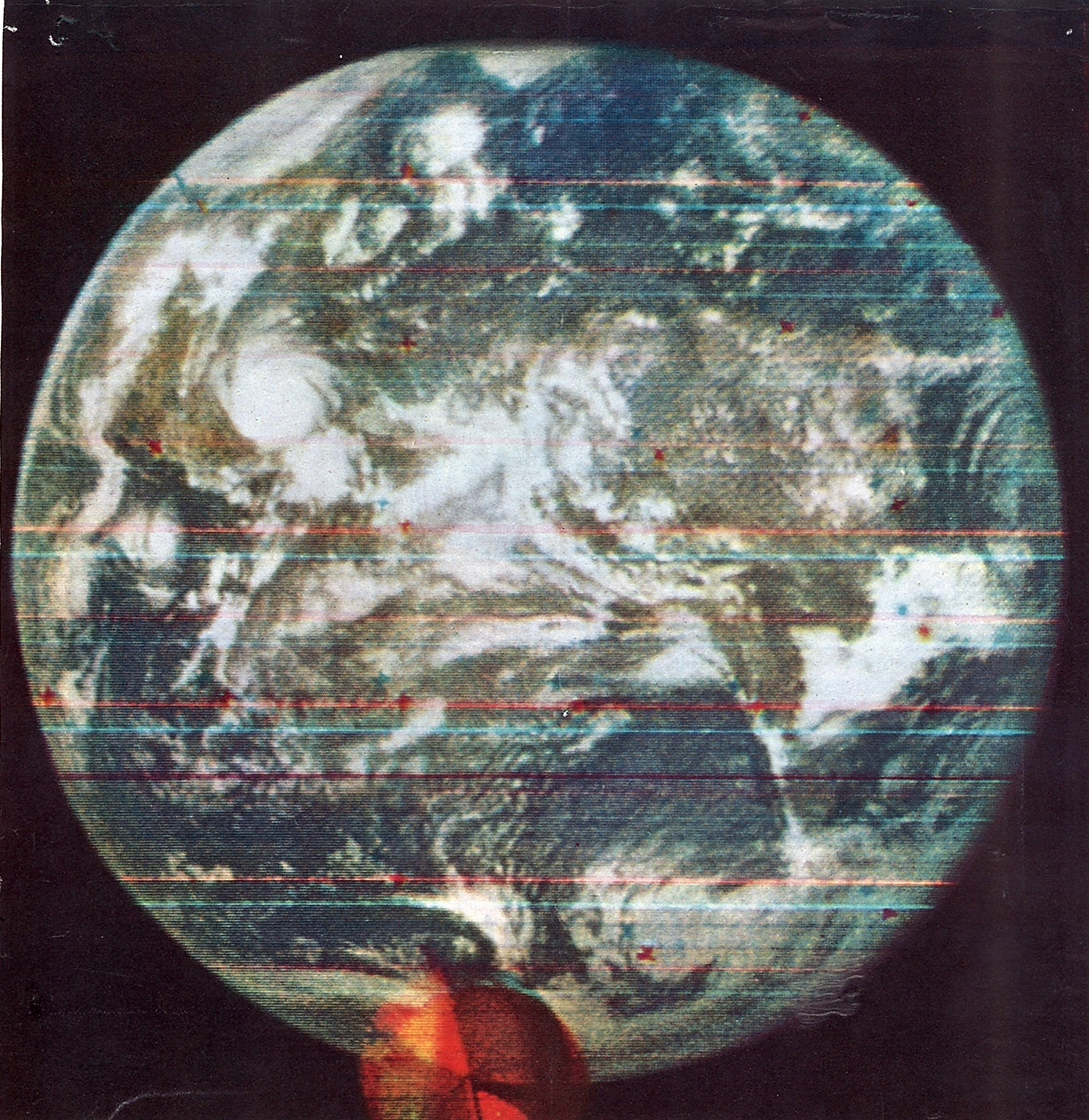
17. === ATS-3 ===
  1. November 10, 1967
    First full-disk "true color" picture of the Earth; subsequently used on the cover of the first Whole Earth Catalog.
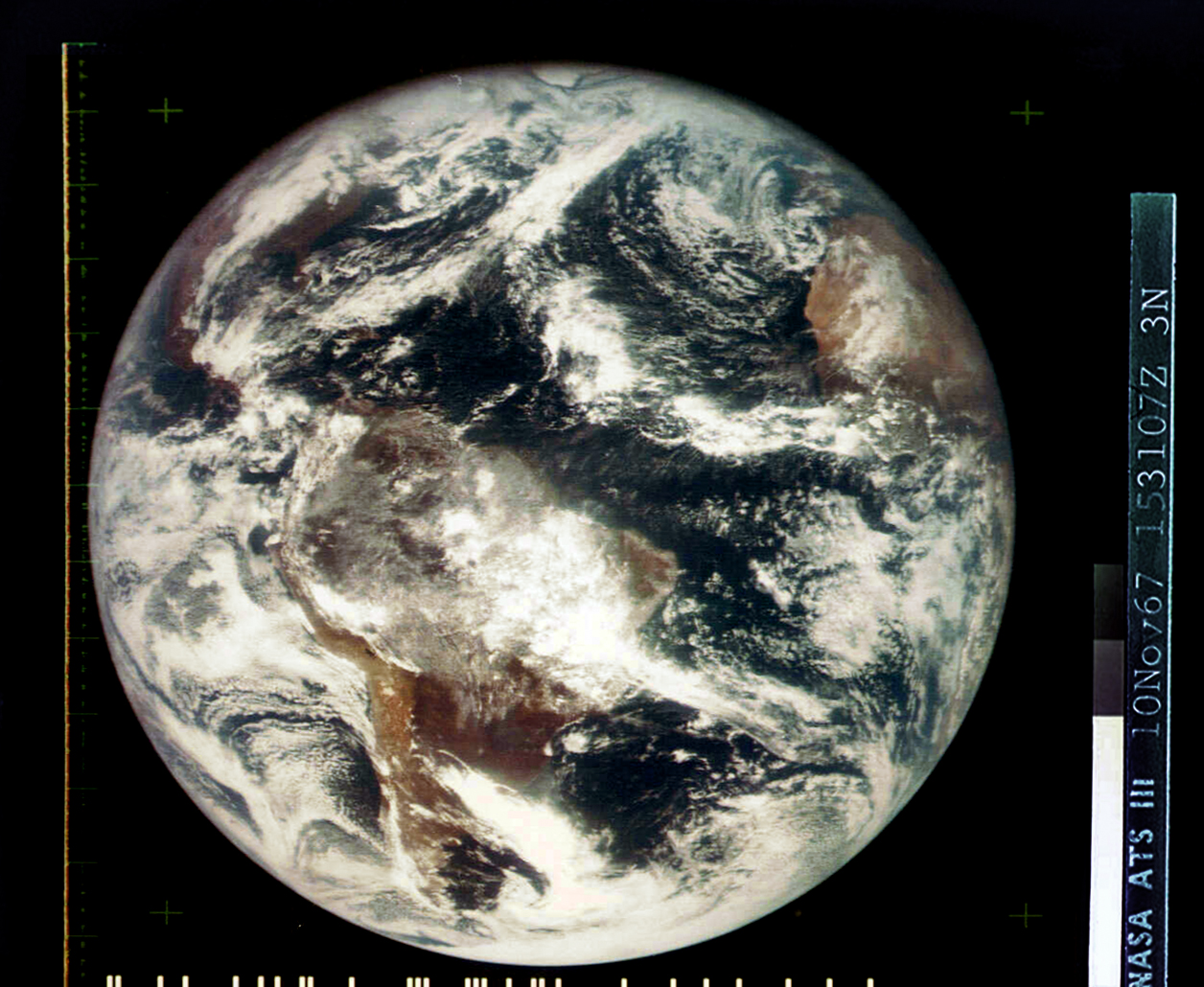
18. === Zond-5 ===
  1. September 14, 1968
    Black-and-white image of a half-disk of the Earth with Africa and Arabian Peninsula clearly visible. The images were taken approximately 90,000 km away from Earth. They were taken on the film camera with 400mm focal length.
    External image
    - 13 X 18 cm image
19. === Apollo 8 ===
  1. December 21, 1968 (December solstice)
    First full-disk image of Earth from space taken by a person (astronaut William Anders).
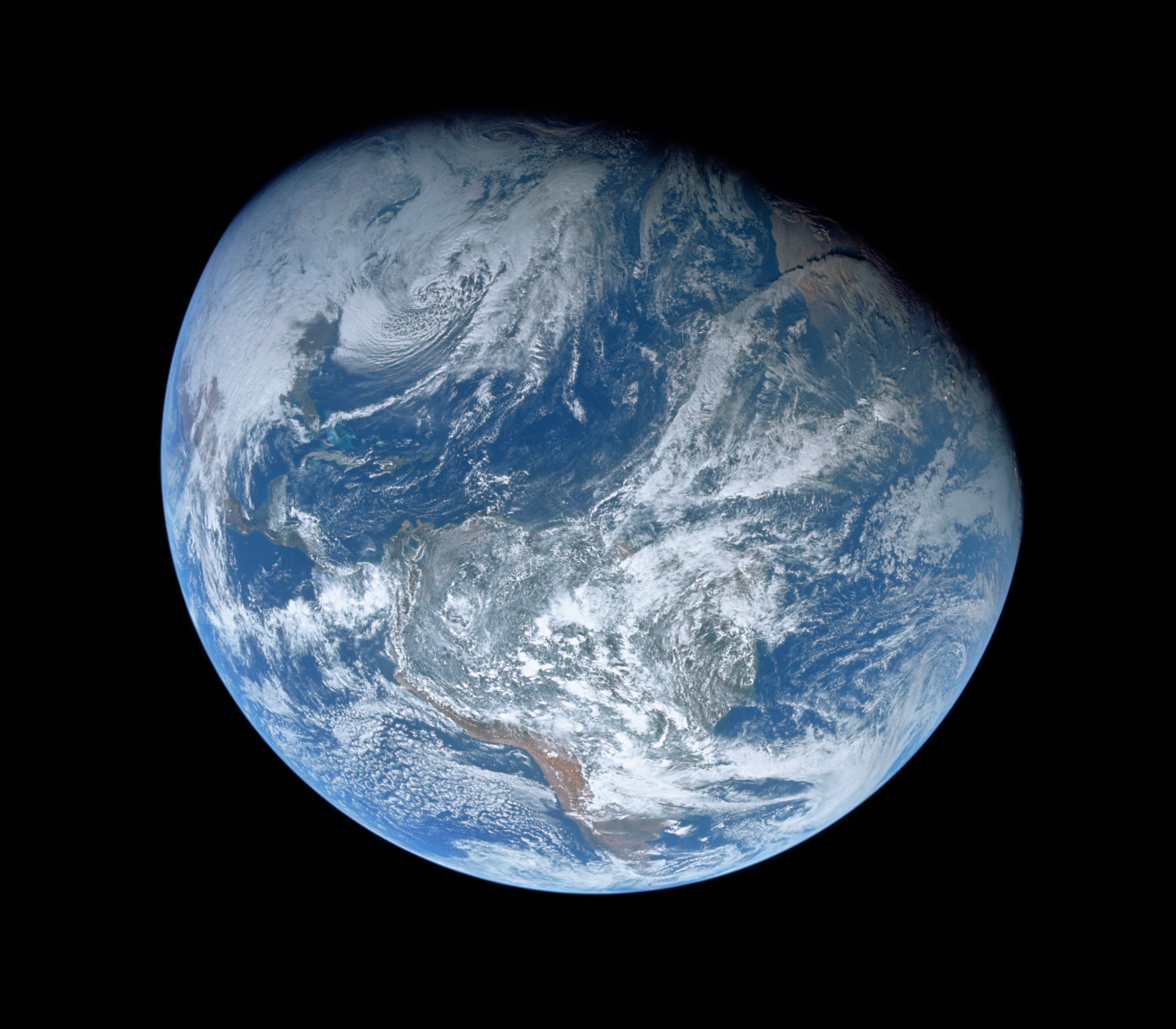
  2. December 24, 1968
    The first photograph of Earth taken by a person (William Anders) while orbiting another astronomical object (the Moon). For a colorized version see this image.
  3. December 24, 1968
    The Earthrise image is the first color image of Earth by a person (William Anders) while orbiting the Moon, moments after his black-and-white photograph.
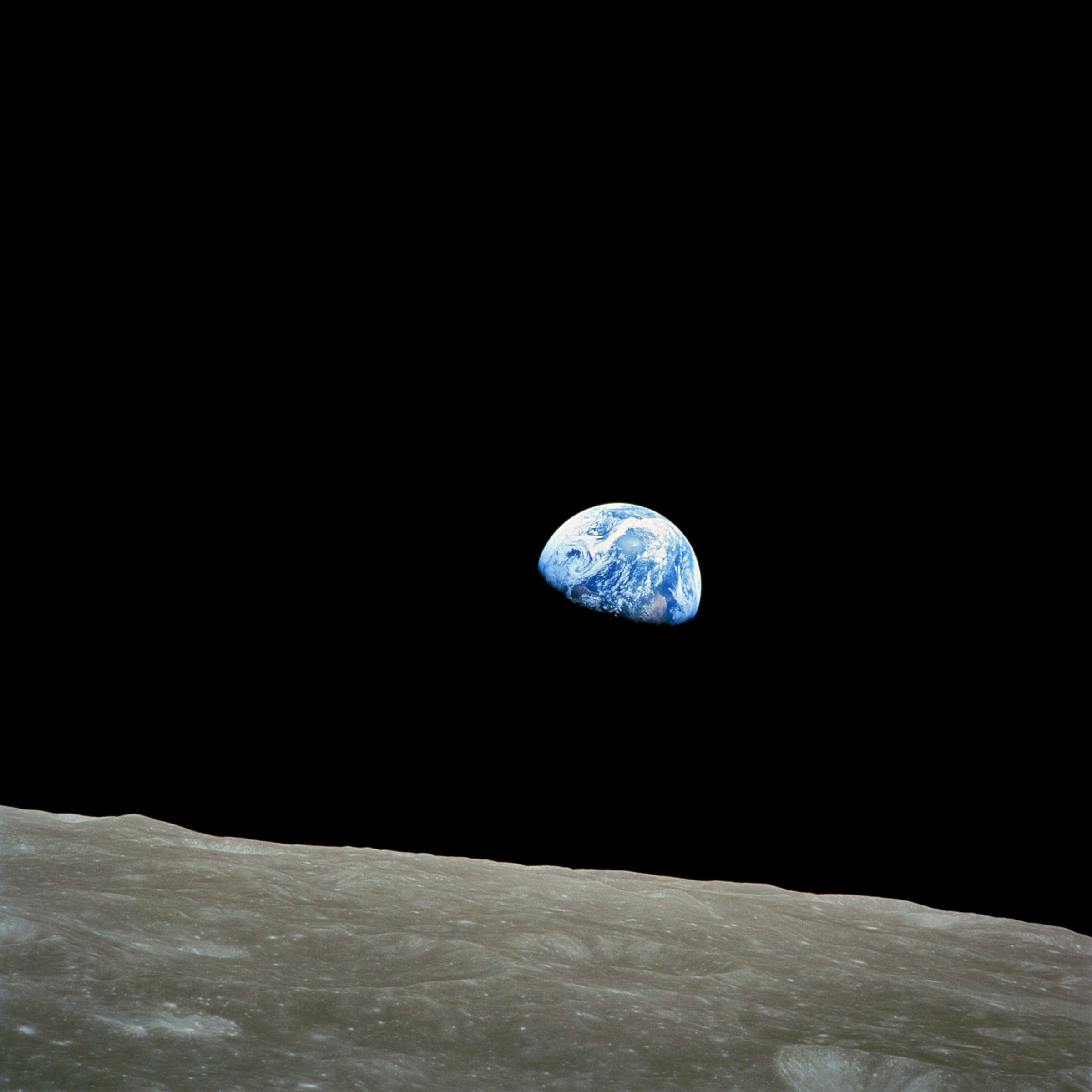
20. === Apollo 11 ===
  1. July 21, 1969
    The much reproduced full frame image AS11-40-5903 of Buzz Aldrin; happens to be the first indirect image of Earth taken by a person from the surface of another astronomical object (from the Moon), having by accident in his visor a reflection of Earth.
  2. July 21, 1969
    First direct image of Earth taken by a person from the surface of another astronomical object (from the Moon), (AS11-40-5923).
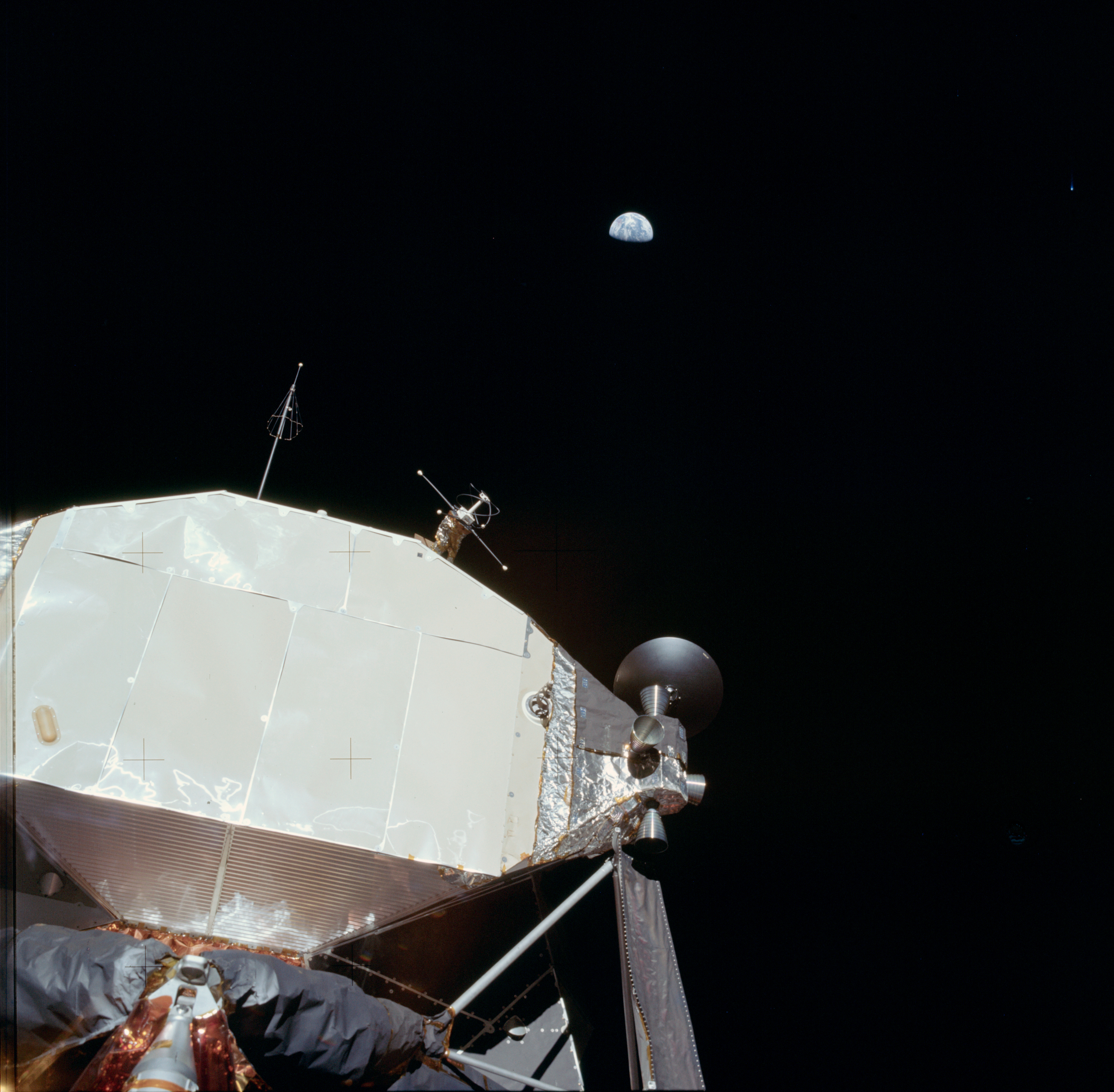
21. === Apollo 12 ===
  1. November 24, 1969
    First images (black-and-white and 16mm color film) of a solar eclipse with the Earth, taken by a human, when the Apollo 12 spacecraft aligned its view of the Sun with the Earth.
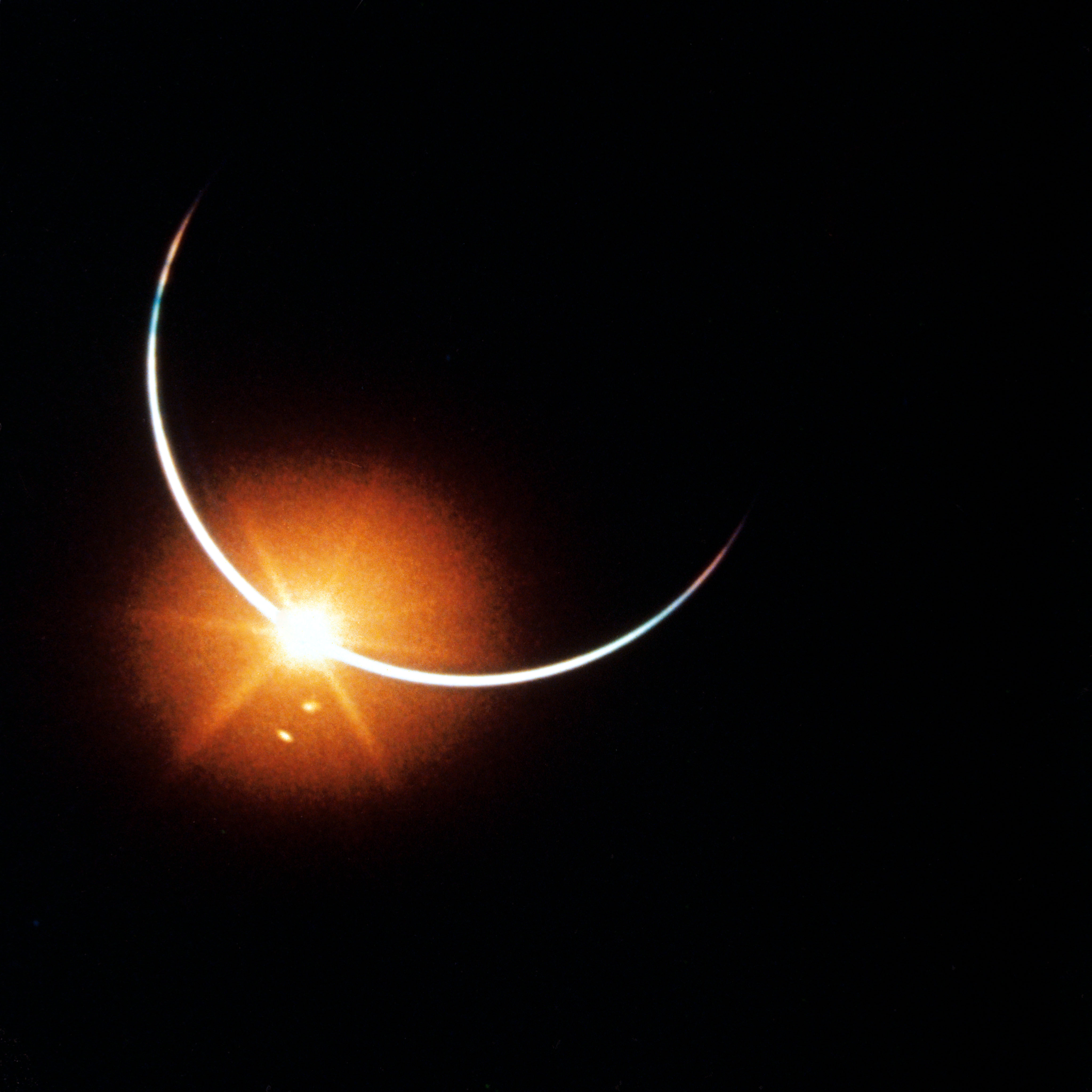
22. === ISIS–2 ===
  1. 1971
    First full image of an aurora borealis
    External image
    - image icon
23. === Apollo 17 ===
  1. December 7, 1972
    First fully illuminated color image of the Earth by a person (AS17-148-22725) and of the South Pole region, being illuminated around December solstice. This photo was taken just before another picture was taken with the same perspective, which cropped and processed became the widely used Blue Marble picture (AS17-148-22727).
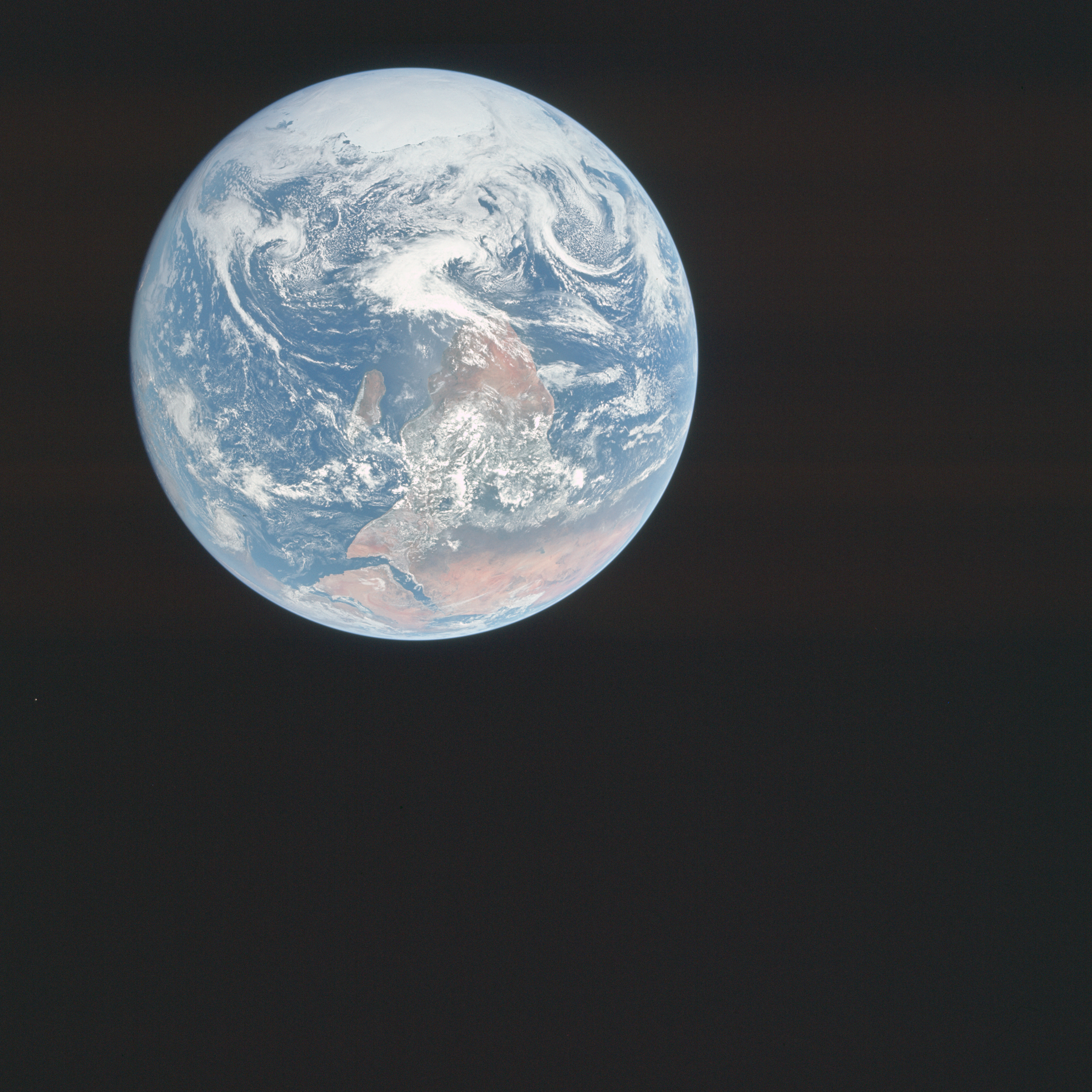
24. === Skylab 3 ===
  1. July–September 1973
    Early color image of an aurora by a human from space.
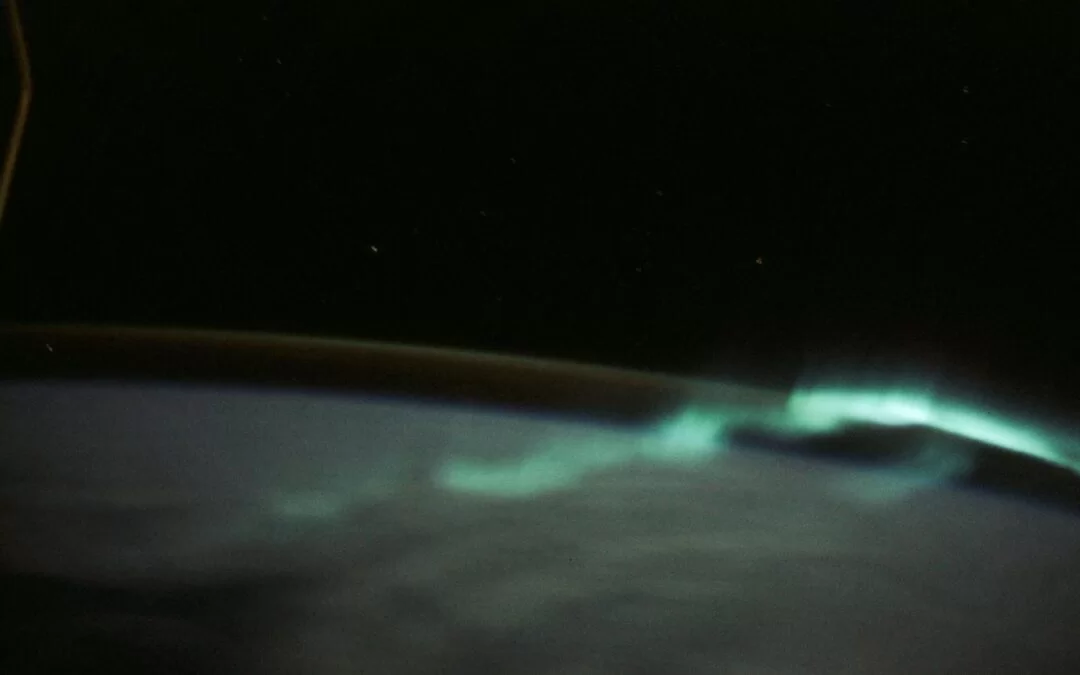
25. === Mariner 10 ===
  1. November 1973 (components) / 1999 (composition)
    Mariner took the first high resolution digital color images of Earth from heliocentric orbit in interplanetary space at 2.6 million kilometers, as in this mosaic and composite size comparison image of Earth and the Moon produced in 1999 with images from Mariner 10.
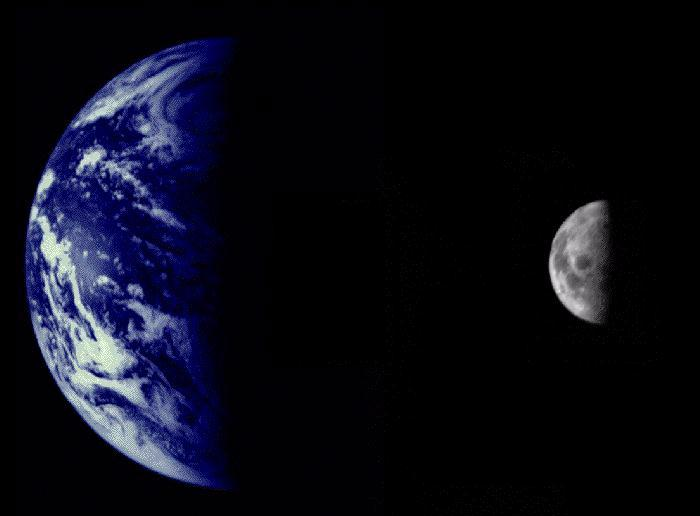
26. === KH-11 ===
  1. 1977
    First real-time satellite imagery.
27. === Voyager 1 ===
  1. September 18, 1977
    First full-disk picture and first single frame picture of Earth and the Moon together.
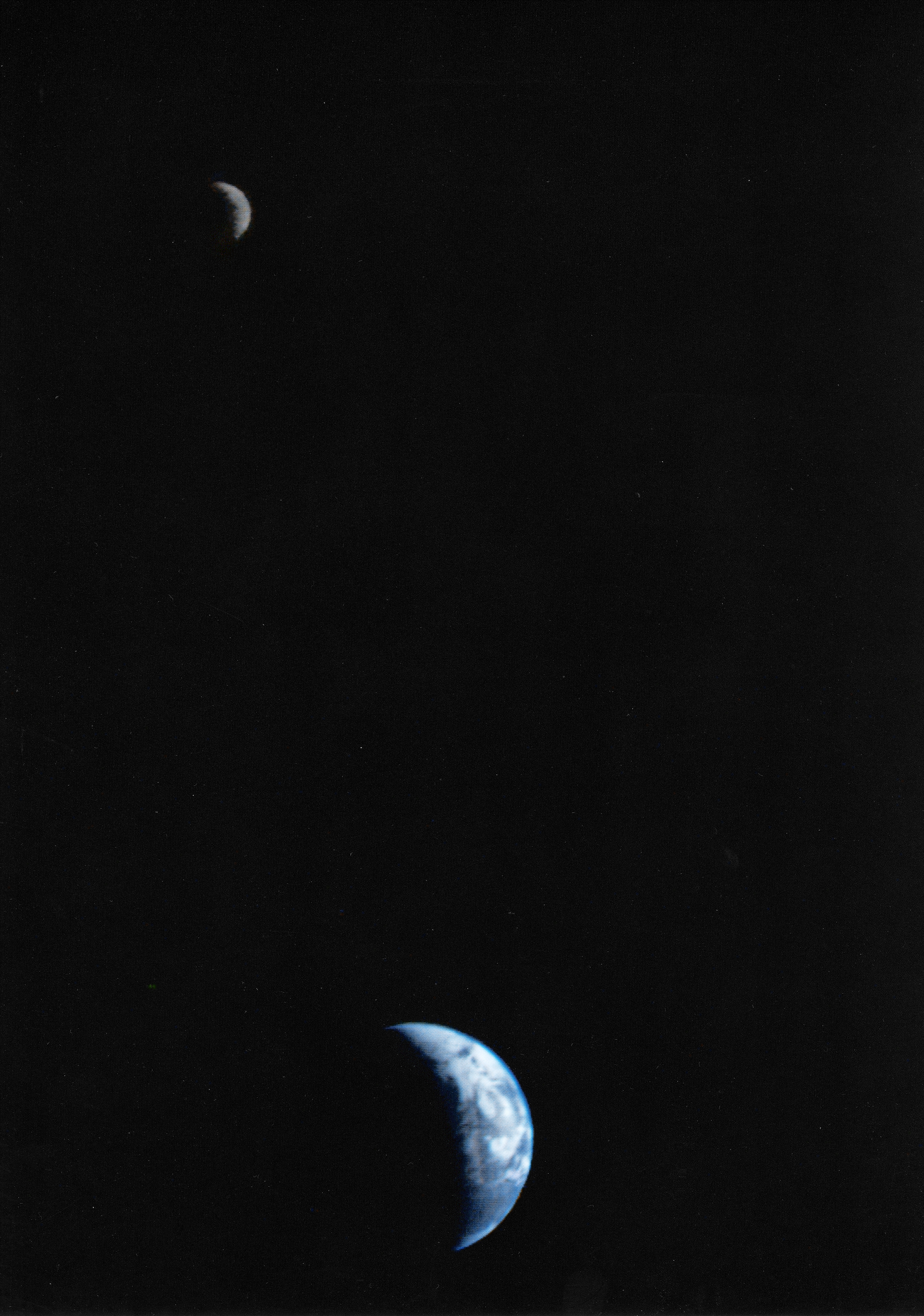
  2. February 14, 1990
    The Pale Blue Dot is the first image of Earth from beyond all of the other Solar System planets. It is part of the first picture of the full extent of the planetary system, known as the Family Portrait.
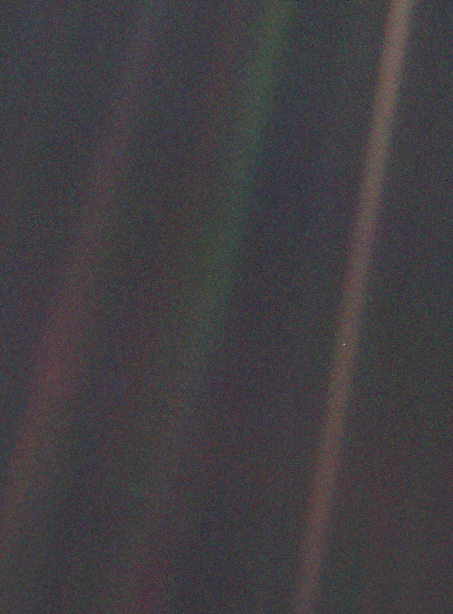
28. === Galileo ===
  1. December 11, 1990
    First interplanetary fly-by image of Earth during the second ever Earth fly-by, which is also the first frame of the first movie of a full rotation of Earth.
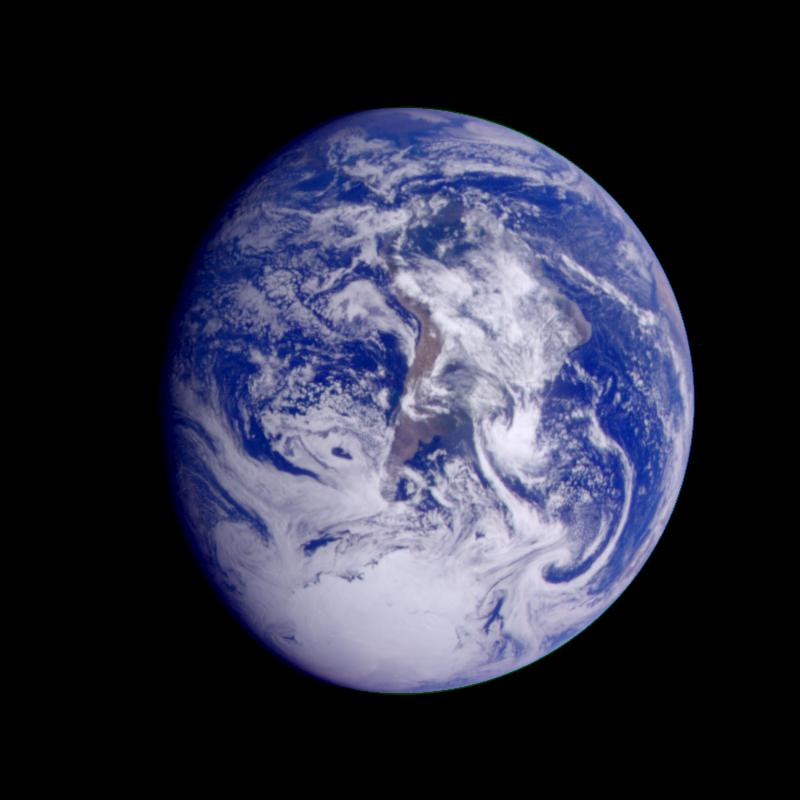
29. === IKONOS ===
  1. October 13, 1999
    First commercial high-resolution (sub-meter) satellite photography (non-classified); it made the cover of The New York Times.
    External image
    - image icon
30. === Mars Global Surveyor ===
  1. May 8, 2003 13:00 UTC
    First image of Earth (and the Moon) from another planet (in orbit around Mars); notice South America is visible.
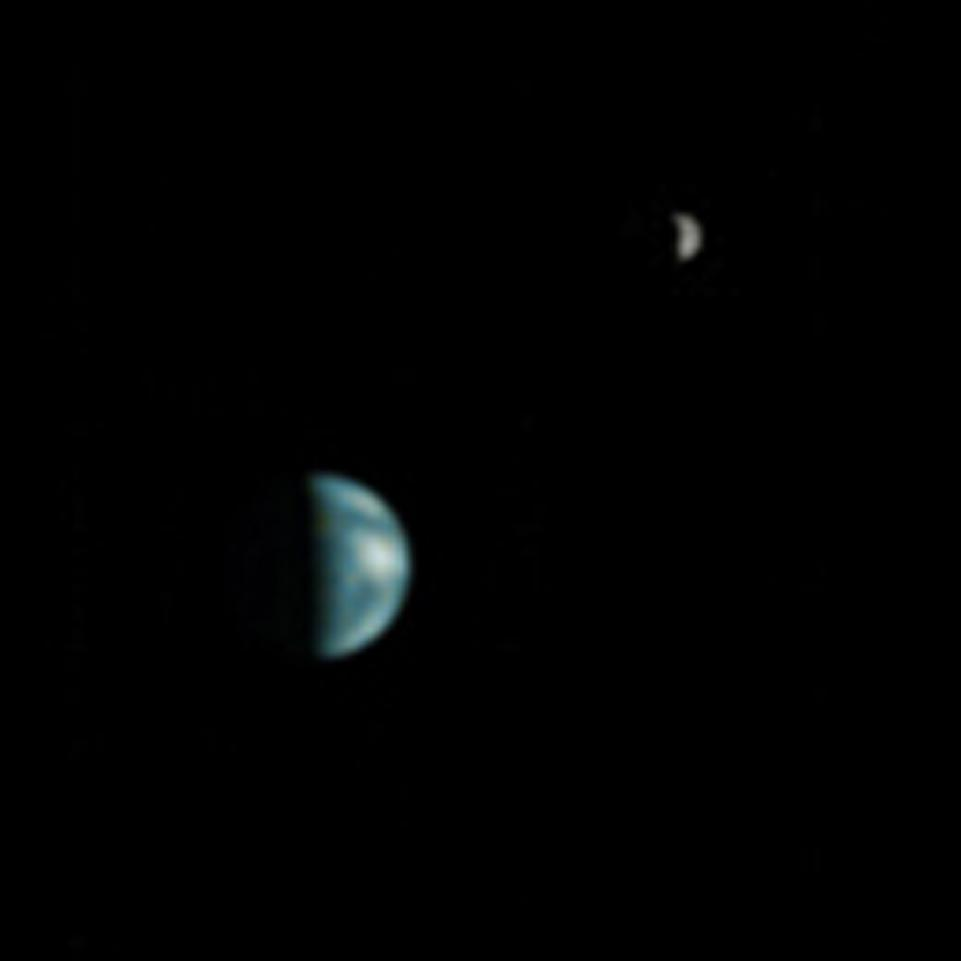
31. === Spirit Mars Exploration rover ===
  1. March 11, 2004
    First image taken of Earth from the surface of Mars and any celestial body other than the Moon.
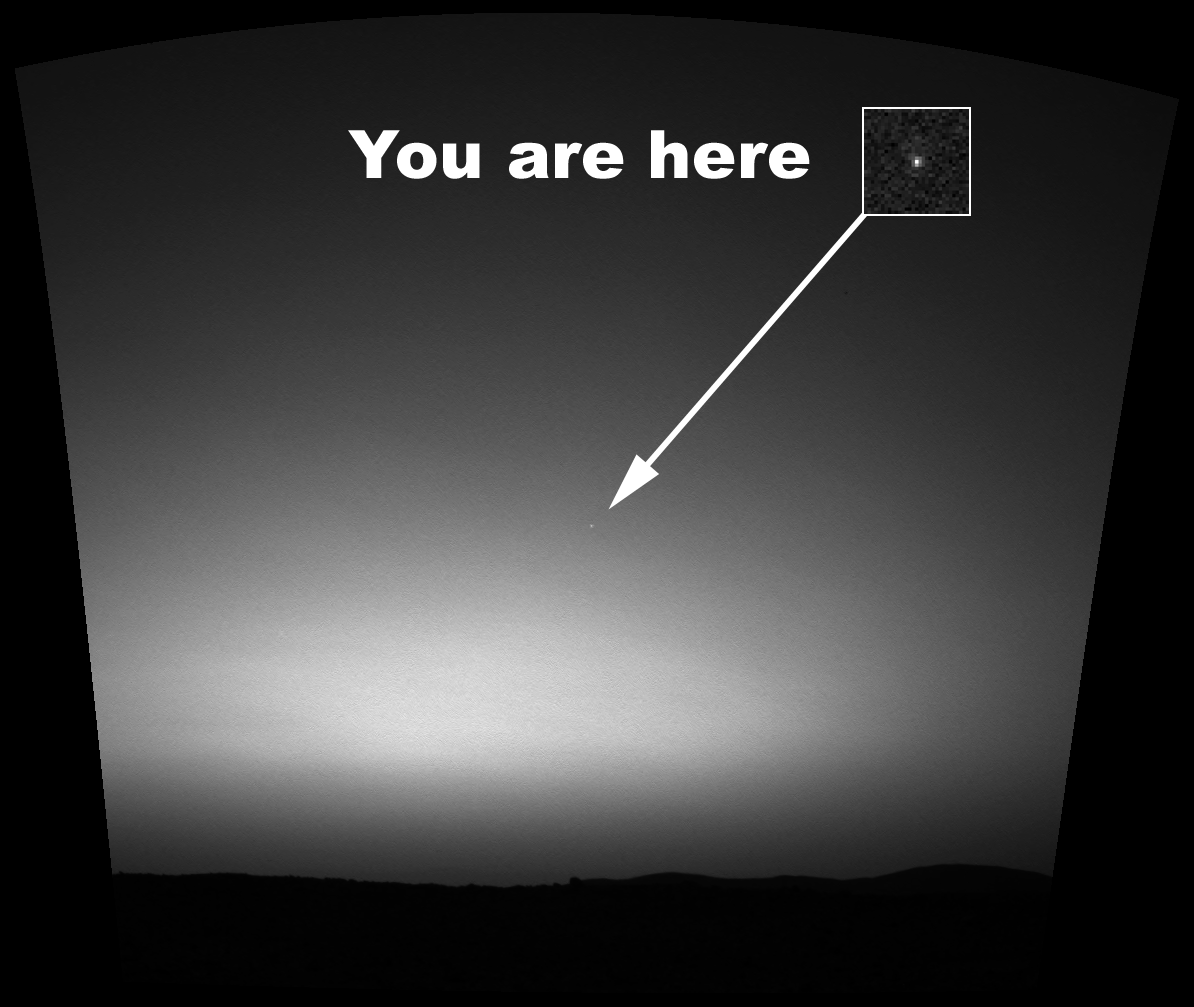
32. === Cassini–Huygens ===
  1. July 27, 2006
    The Pale Blue Orb is the first image of Earth from Saturn.
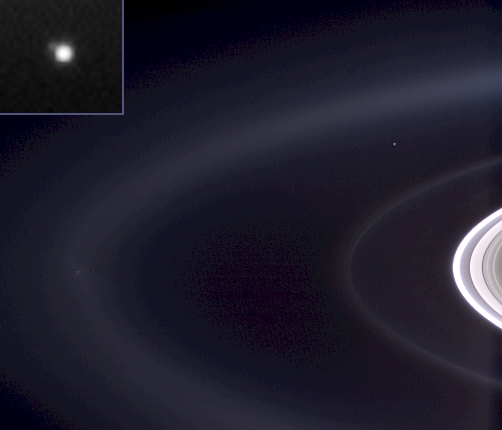
33. === Parker Solar Probe ===
  1. August 9, 2021
    Image and video of Earth from within the outer solar corona, taken during the second time that any probe has ever reached the corona.
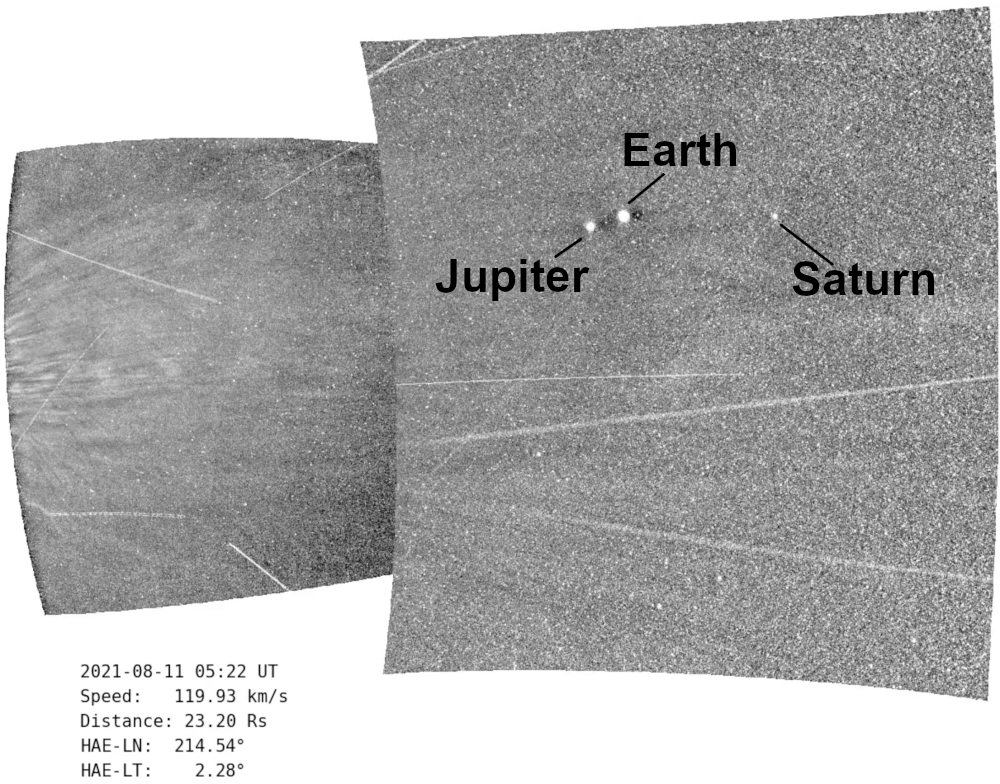
34. === Curiosity ===
  1. September 5, 2024
    First image of Earth with Phobos (from the surface of Mars).
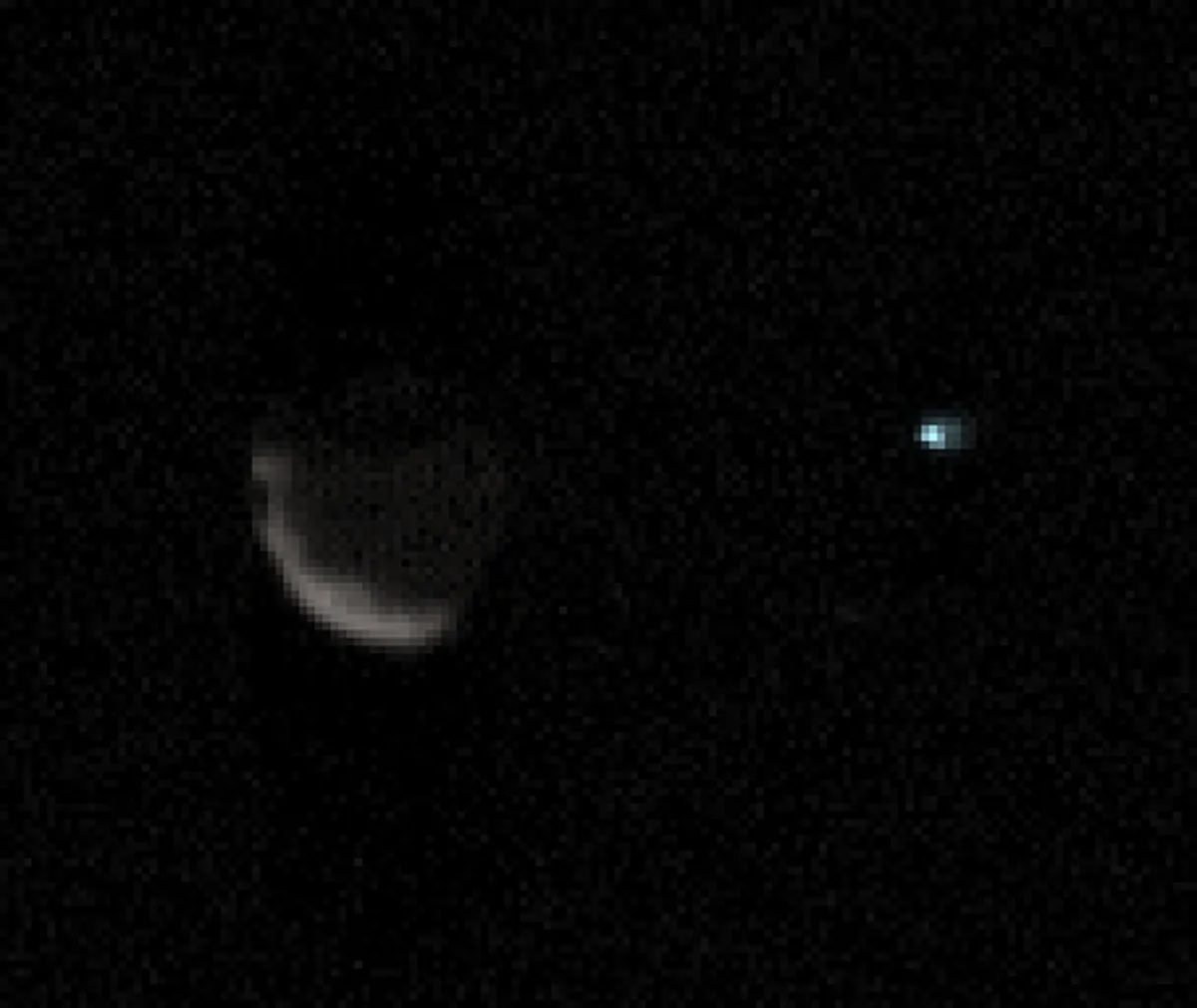
35. === Reid Wiseman (Artemis II) ===
  1. April 3, 2026
    Hello, World, the first published full-disk photo of Earth taken by a human since 1972, is the first taken by a human to show Earth's night side illuminated by moonlight, with city lights, airglow, two auroras, afterglow, and zodiacal light. The photograph also includes Venus.
36. === Christina Koch (Artemis II) ===
  1. April 6, 2026
    Known as Earthset, this is the first photograph taken by a human to show the Moon and Earth in the same frame from thousands of miles beyond the Moon.

V-2

- October 24, 1946 – First images of Earth from outer space, flight monitoring continuous imaging, resulting in a timelapse-movie reel. Not published as Earth observation images until 1950. Taken by the V-2 No. 13 suborbital spaceflight, the eighth successful US spaceflight and one of the first over-all.
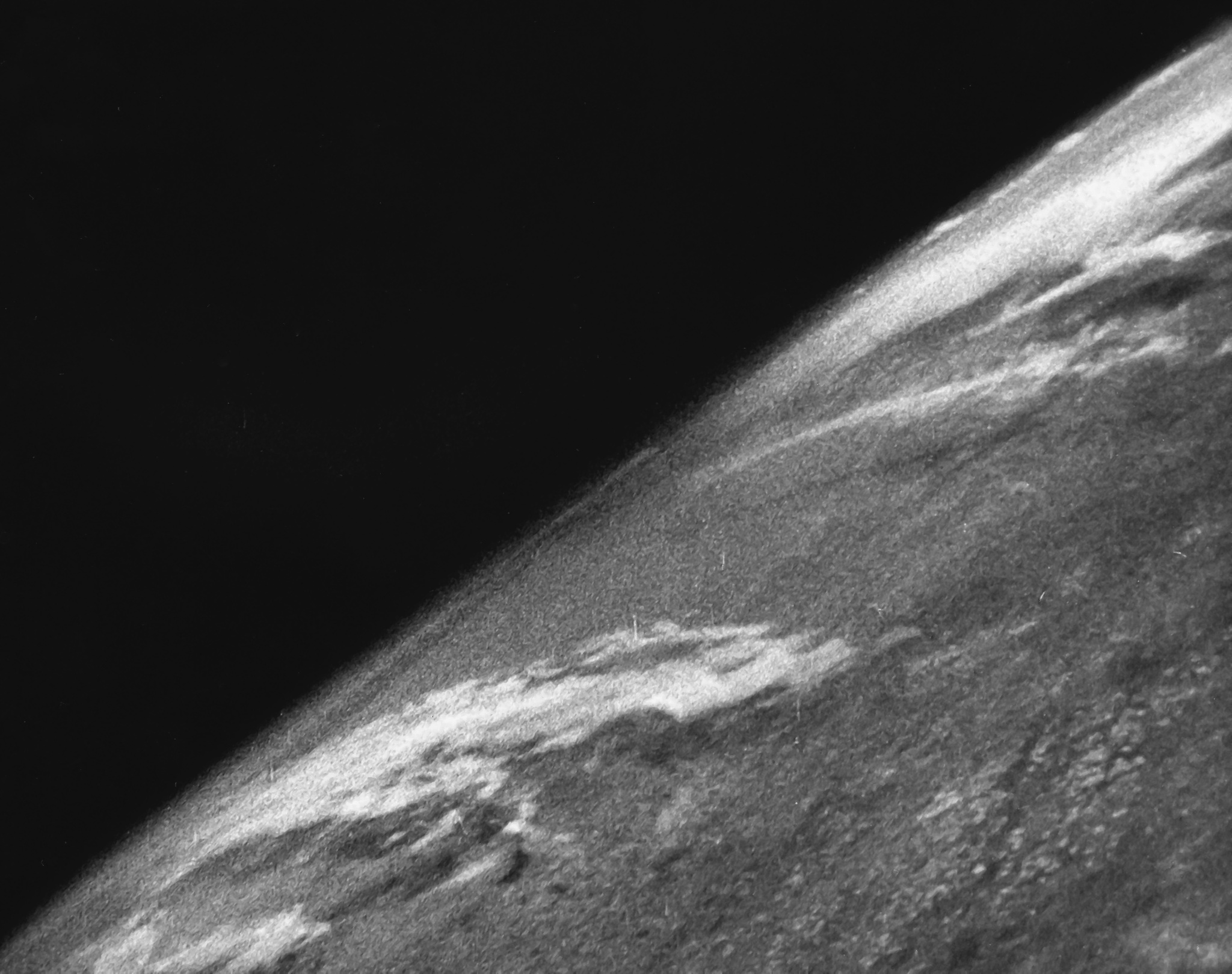
- March 7, 1947 – First dedicated and first published Earth observation images from outer space, first published on March 25, 1947.
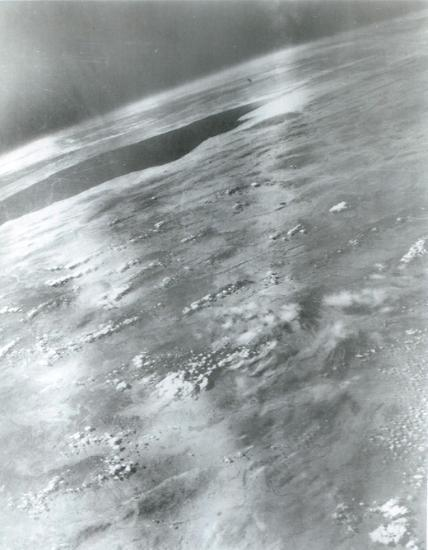
- July 26, 1948 – First prepared wide-angle panorama of Earth from outer space.
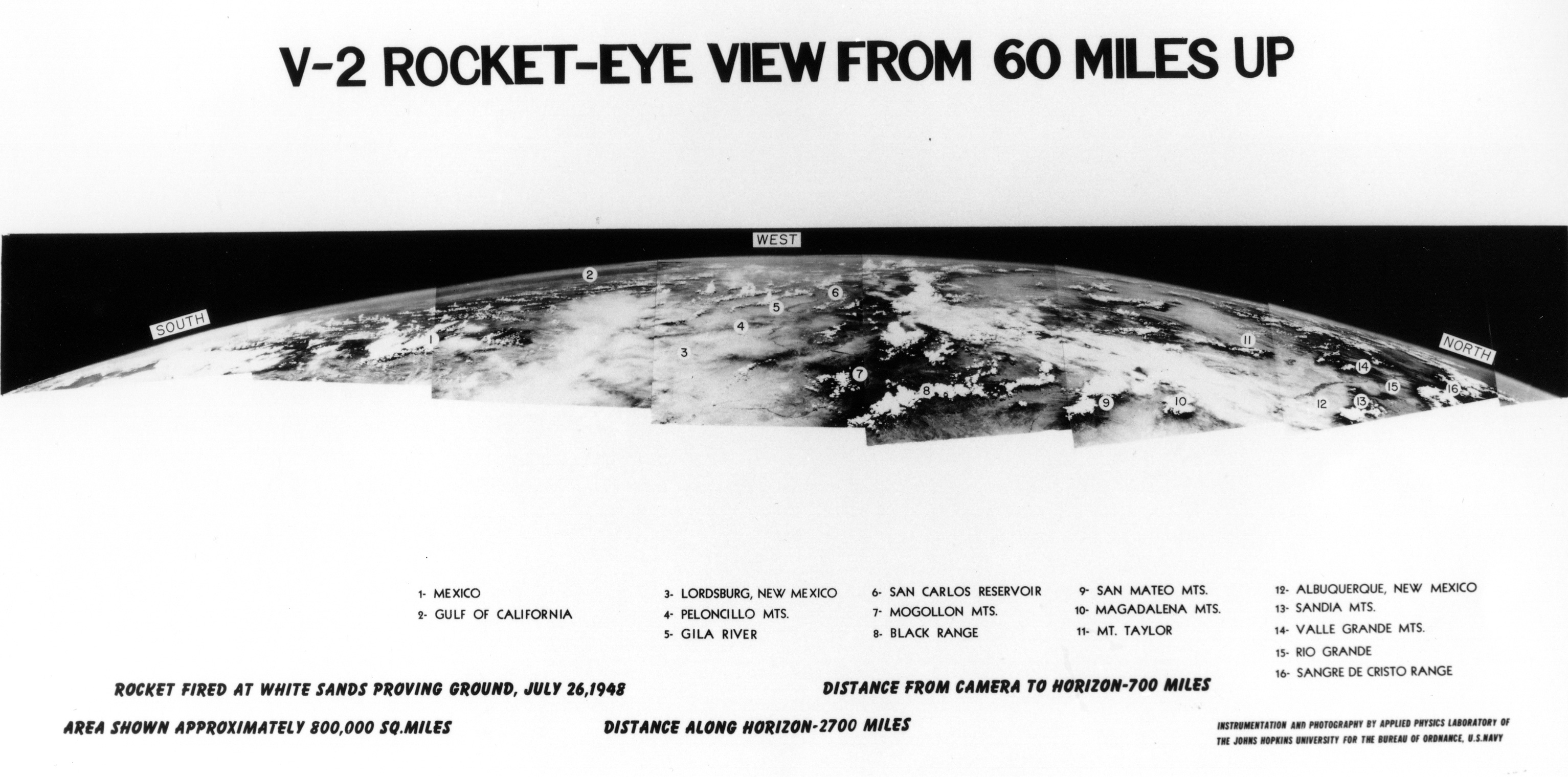

Aerobee AJ10-24 RTV-N-10b

- October 5, 1954 – The first color image from space as part in the left corner of this first color photomosaic of Earth from space, composed of 117 images taken from an altitude of 100 miles (160 km).
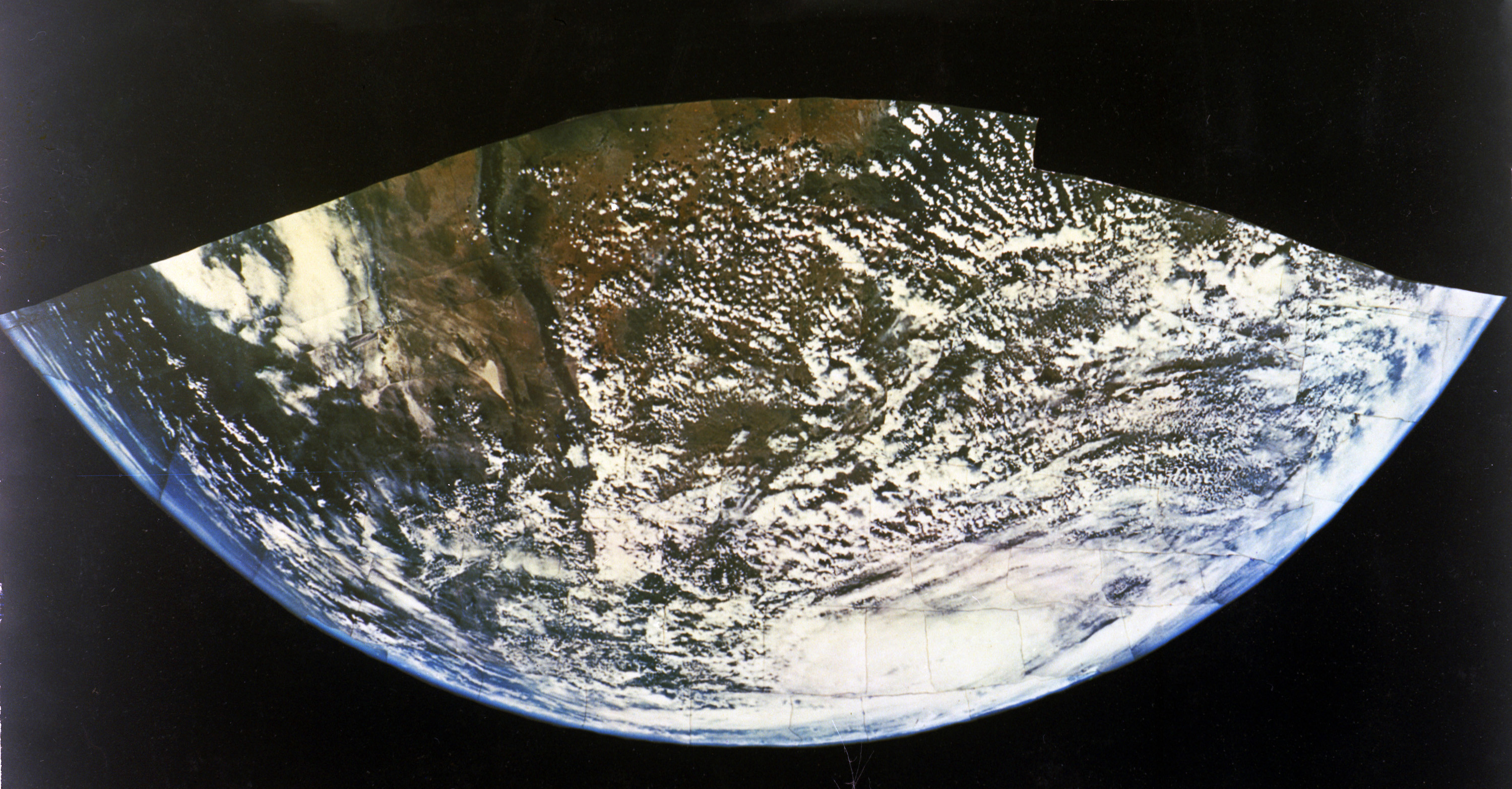

Vanguard 2

- February–March 1959 – First attempt of a scanner, in which a single photocell mounted at the focus of telescope would scan Earth due to the satellite movement; resulting images were poor.

Explorer 6

- August 14, 1959 – First image of Earth from orbit, showing a sunlit area of the Central Pacific Ocean and its cloud cover.
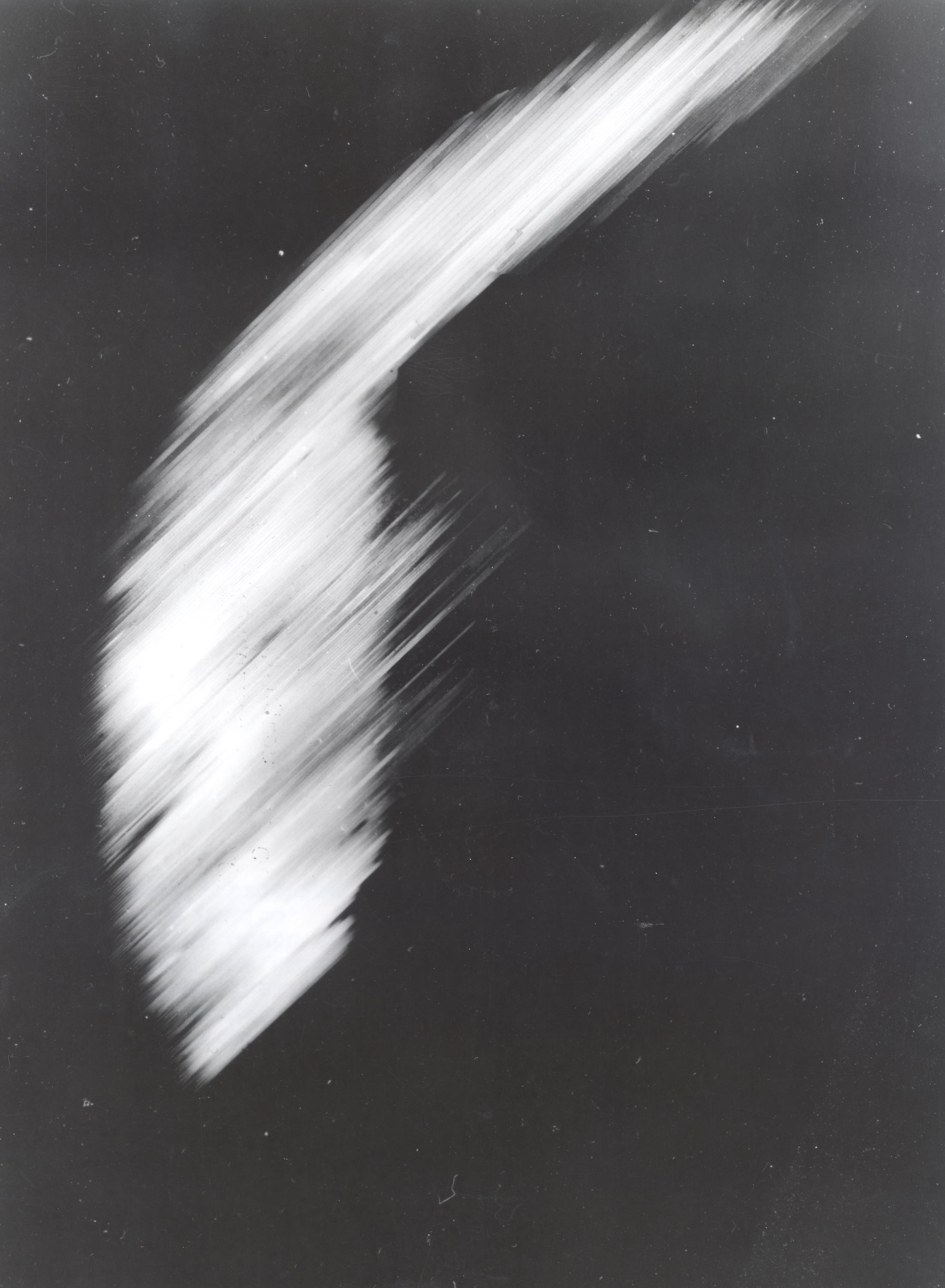

Explorer 7

- 1959 – The first "coarse maps of the solar radiation reflected by the Earth and the infrared radiation emitted by the Earth", from a mission launched on October 13, 1959.

TIROS-1

- 1960 – First television image of Earth from space and first weather satellite picture.
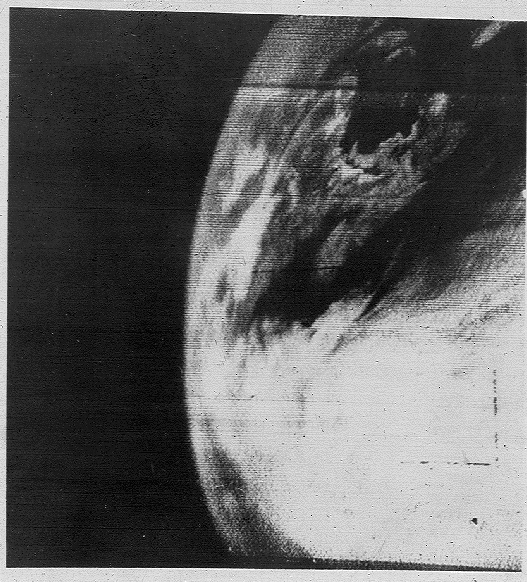

CORONA

- August 18, 1960 – "First space-based Earth observation system"; its first successful mission was Discoverer 14 on 19 August 1960 with the recovery of photographic film from an orbiting satellite.
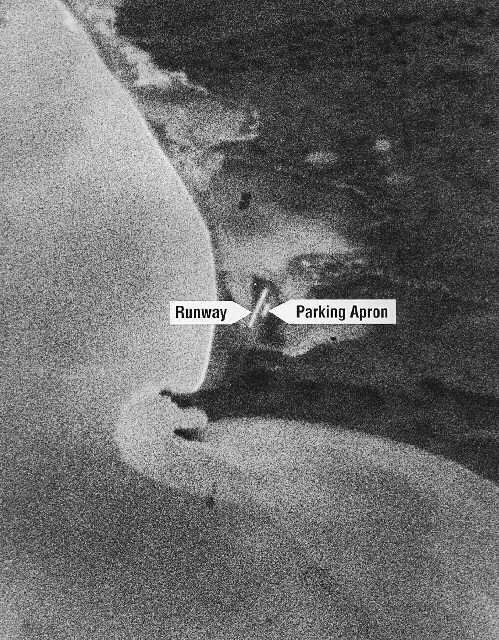

Vostok 2

- August 6, 1961 – First image, color images and movie of Earth from space taken by a person, by cosmonaut Gherman Titov – the first photographer from space.
  External image
  - image icon

KH-7 Gambit

- 1963 – First high-resolution (sub-meter spatial resolution) satellite photography (classified).
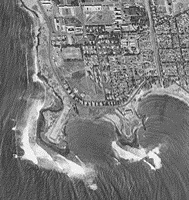

Quill

- 1964 – First radar images of Earth from space, using a synthetic aperture radar (SAR). This shows part of Richmond, Virginia.
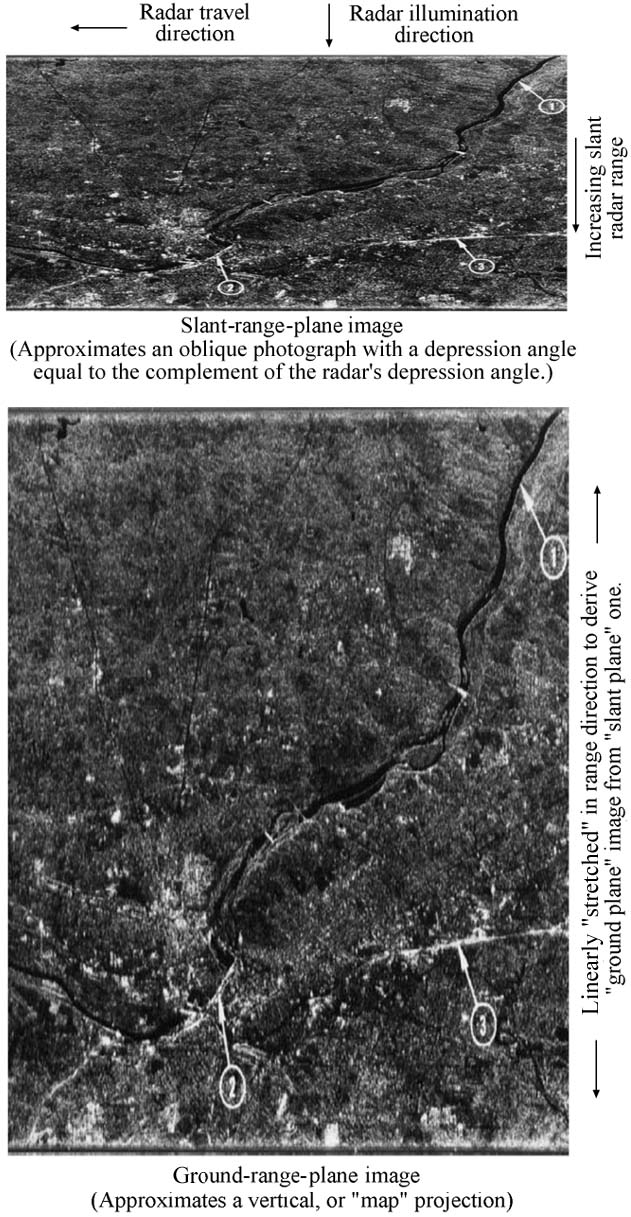

Voskhod 2

- March 18, 1965 – First image and movie of Earth with a human (Alexei Leonov) floating in space (the first ever EVA).
  See article
- March 18, 1965 – First drawing of Earth from space and art made in space (by Leonov, the first artist in space).
  External image
  - image icon

Molniya 1–3

- May 30, 1966 – First full-disk pictures of the Earth, published in Review of Popular Astronomy July–August.
  External image
  - image icon

Lunar Orbiter 1

- August 23, 1966 – First image of Earth while orbiting another astronomical object (the Moon) and first picture of both Earth and the Moon from space. The image (frame 1102; image 102 of Lunar Orbiter 1) consists of three parts h1-h3. Since its original publication its raw analog data has been used to digitally produce the image (including its wide angle version) in higher resolution (see) and clarity (see).
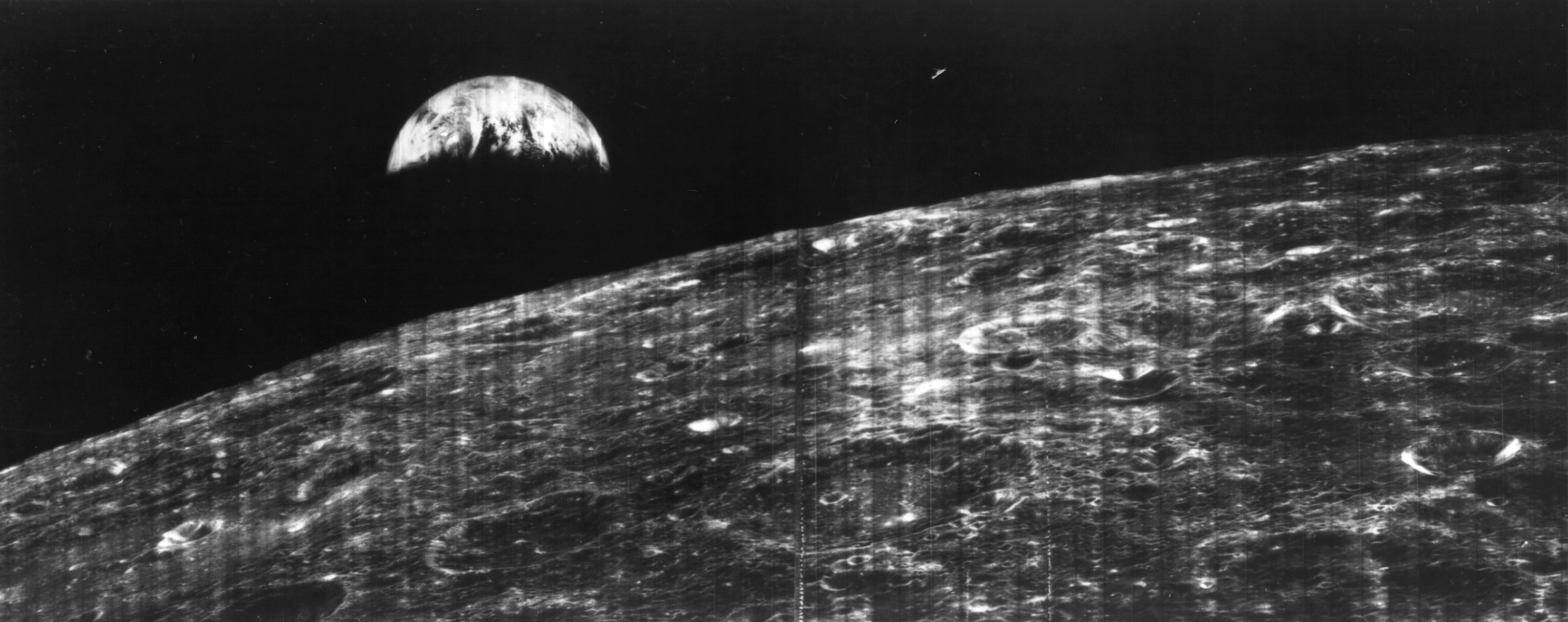

ATS-1

- December 11, 1966 – First picture of both Earth and the Moon from the Earth's orbit.
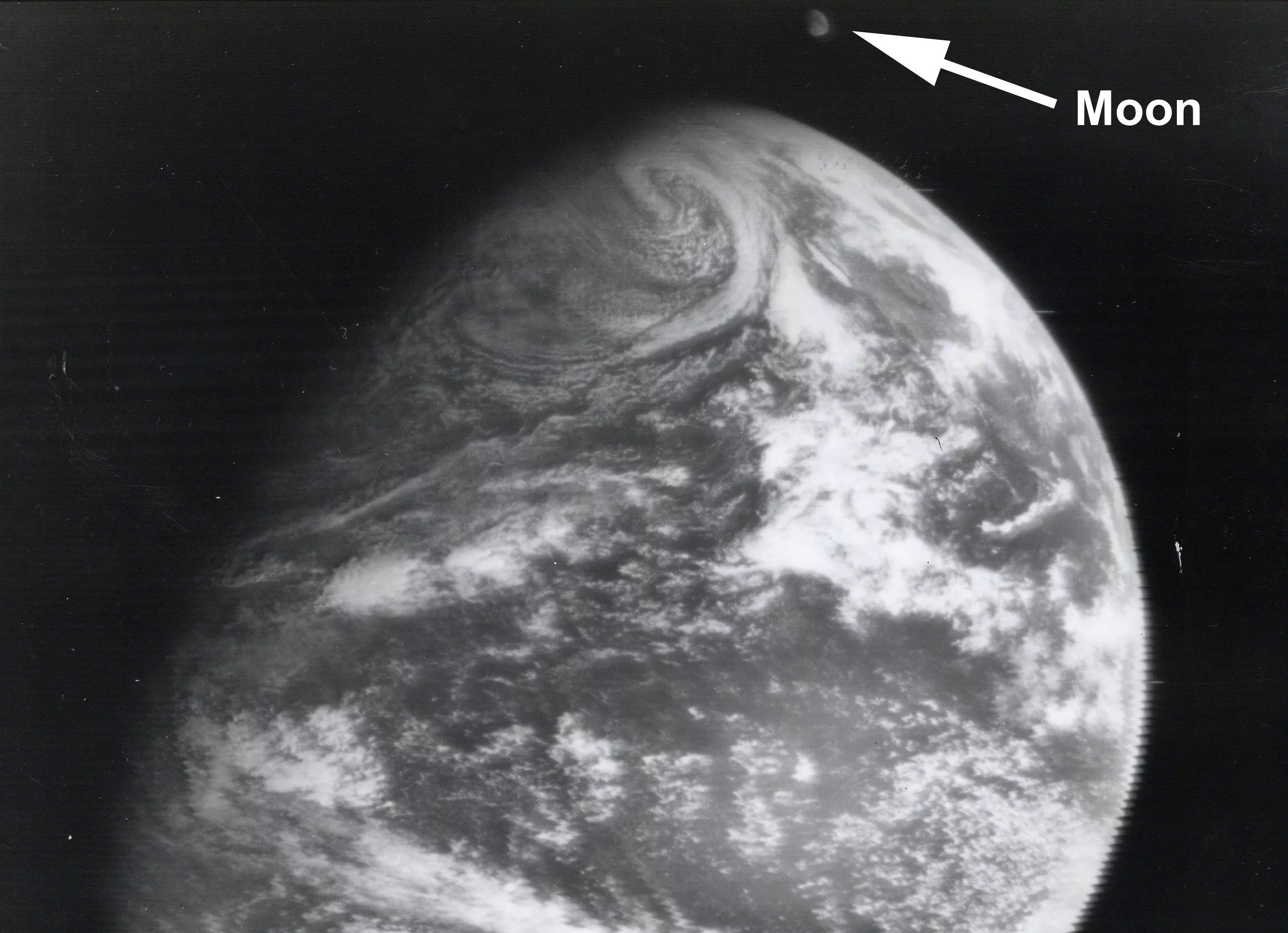
- December 11, 1966 – First full-disk pictures of the Earth from a geostationary orbit.
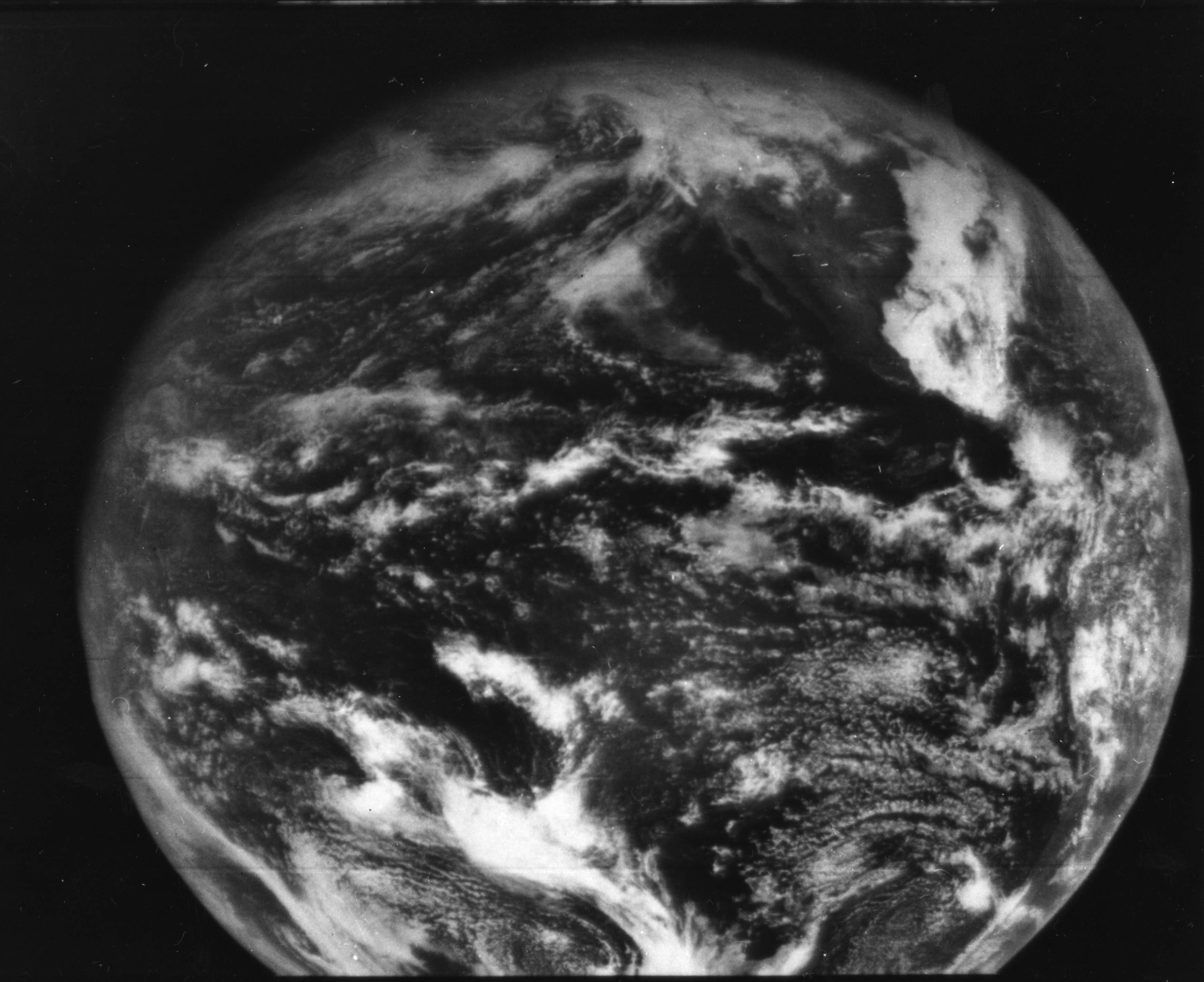
- January 1967 – First movie of Earth from space made without a human camera operator (contrast to Titov's 1961 movie).

Surveyor 3

- April 24, 1967 – First images showing both sunset and sunrise over Earth at the same time, taken from the Moon's surface during a solar eclipse caused by Earth (rather than the Moon).
- April 30, 1967 – First color image of Earth from the surface of another astronomical object, from the Moon's surface.
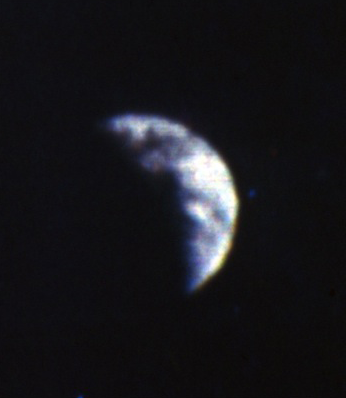

DODGE

- September 20, 1967 (released November 10) – First full-disk black-and-white filtered color picture of the Earth.
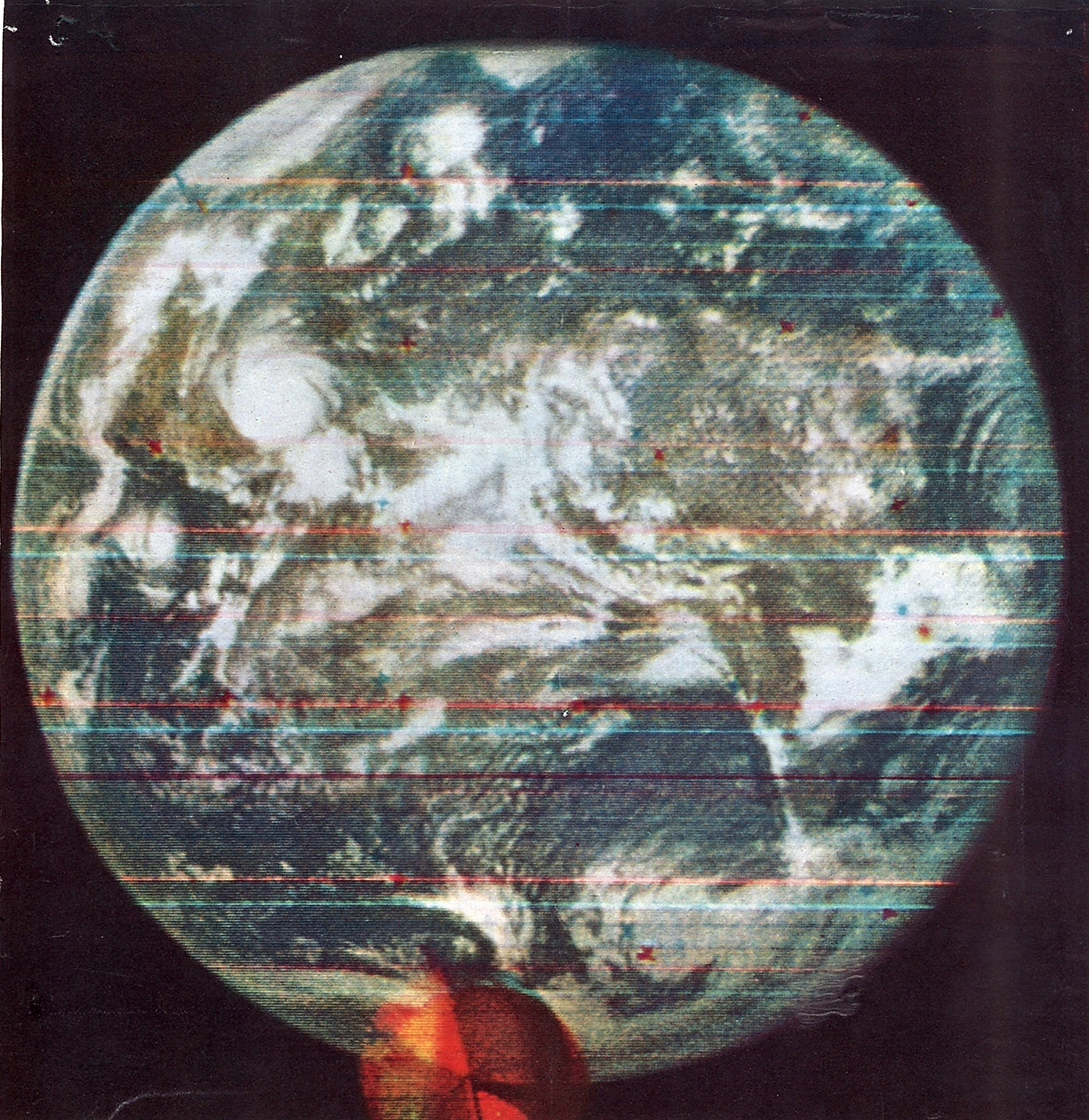

ATS-3

- November 10, 1967 – First full-disk "true color" picture of the Earth; subsequently used on the cover of the first Whole Earth Catalog.
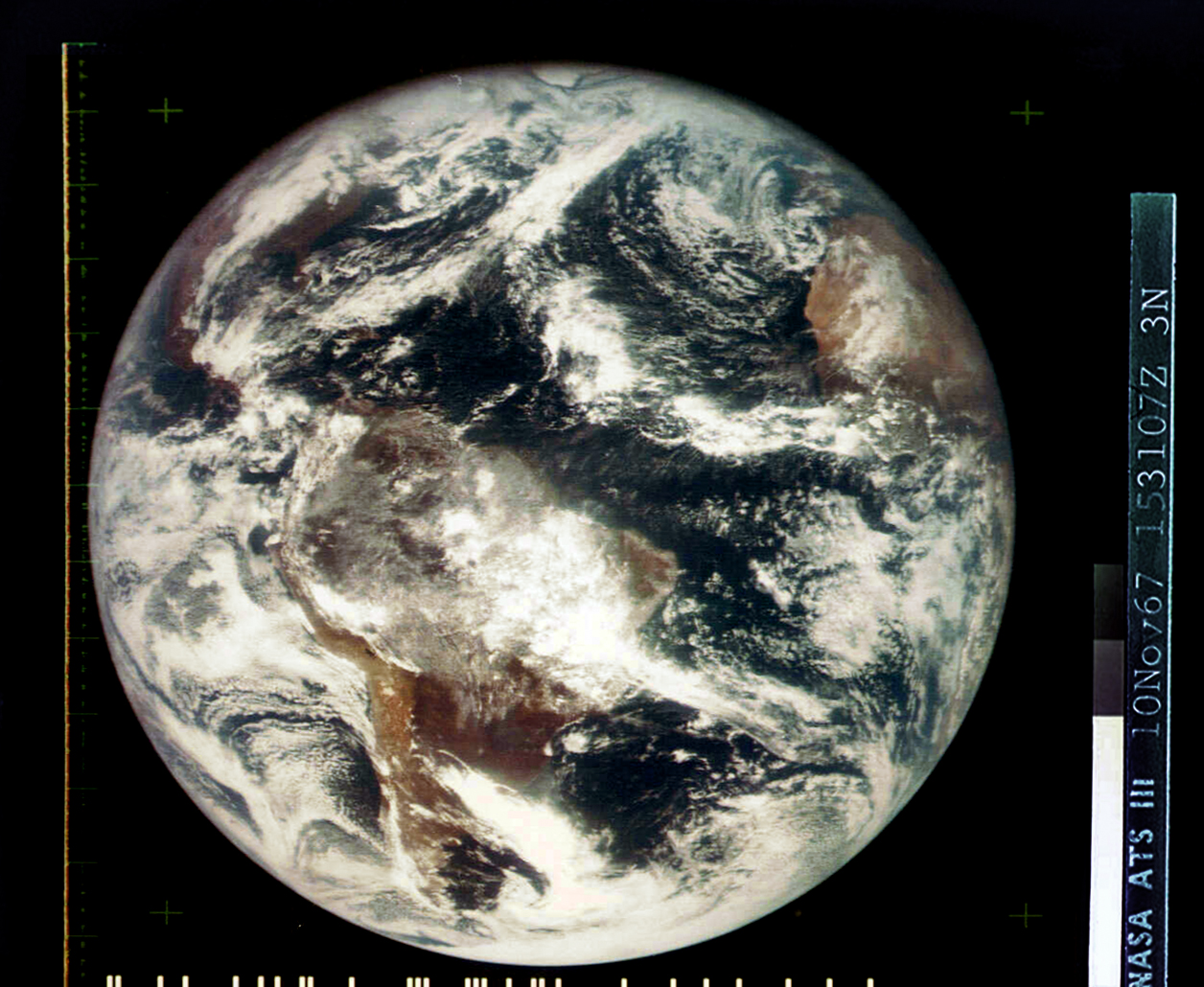

Zond-5

- September 14, 1968 – Black-and-white image of a half-disk of the Earth with Africa and Arabian Peninsula clearly visible. The images were taken approximately 90,000 km away from Earth. They were taken on the film camera with 400mm focal length.
  External image
  - 13 X 18 cm image

Apollo 8

- December 21, 1968 (December solstice) – First full-disk image of Earth from space taken by a person (astronaut William Anders).
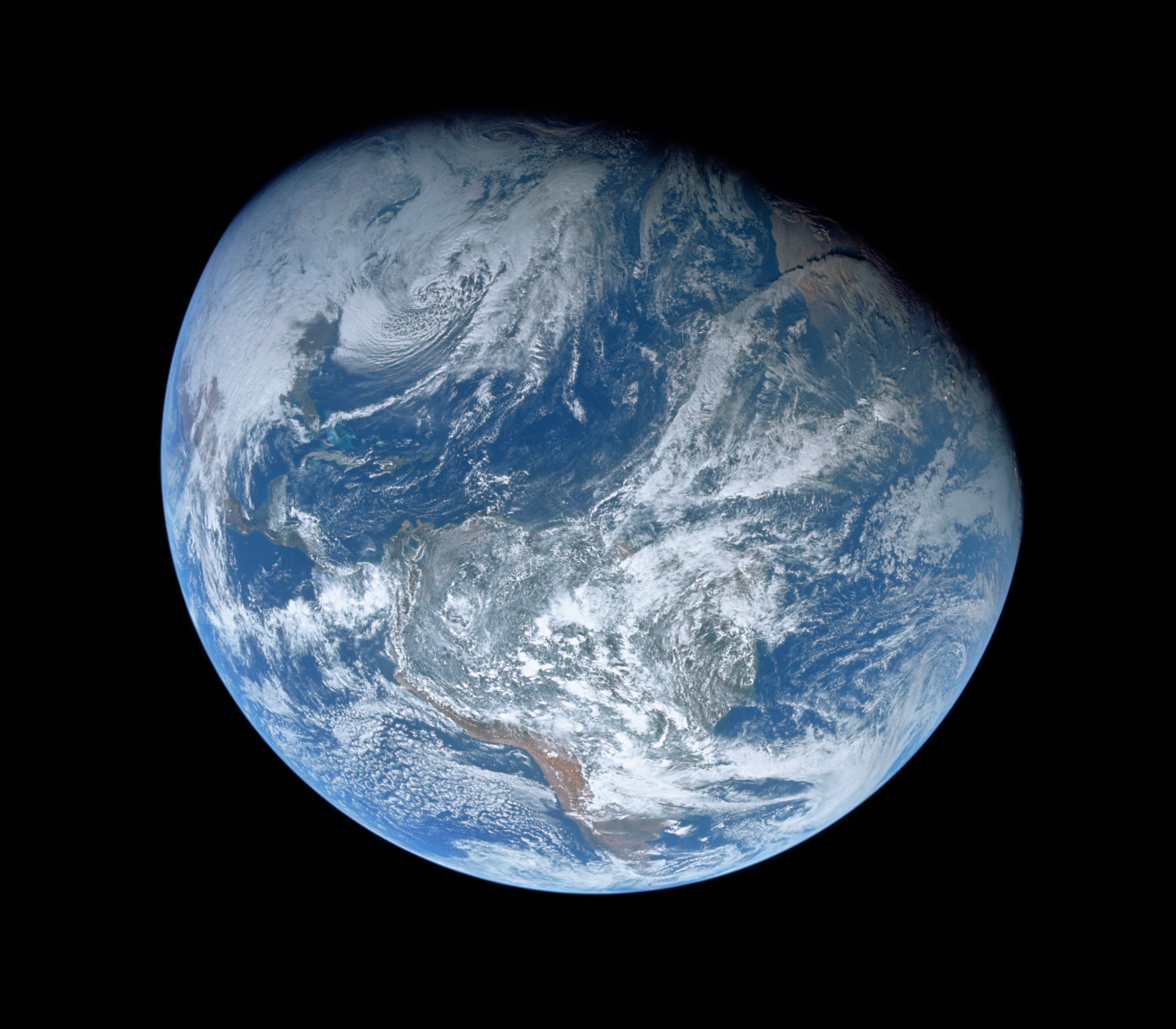
- December 24, 1968 – The first photograph of Earth taken by a person (William Anders) while orbiting another astronomical object (the Moon). For a colorized version see this image.
- December 24, 1968 – The Earthrise image is the first color image of Earth by a person (William Anders) while orbiting the Moon, moments after his black-and-white photograph.
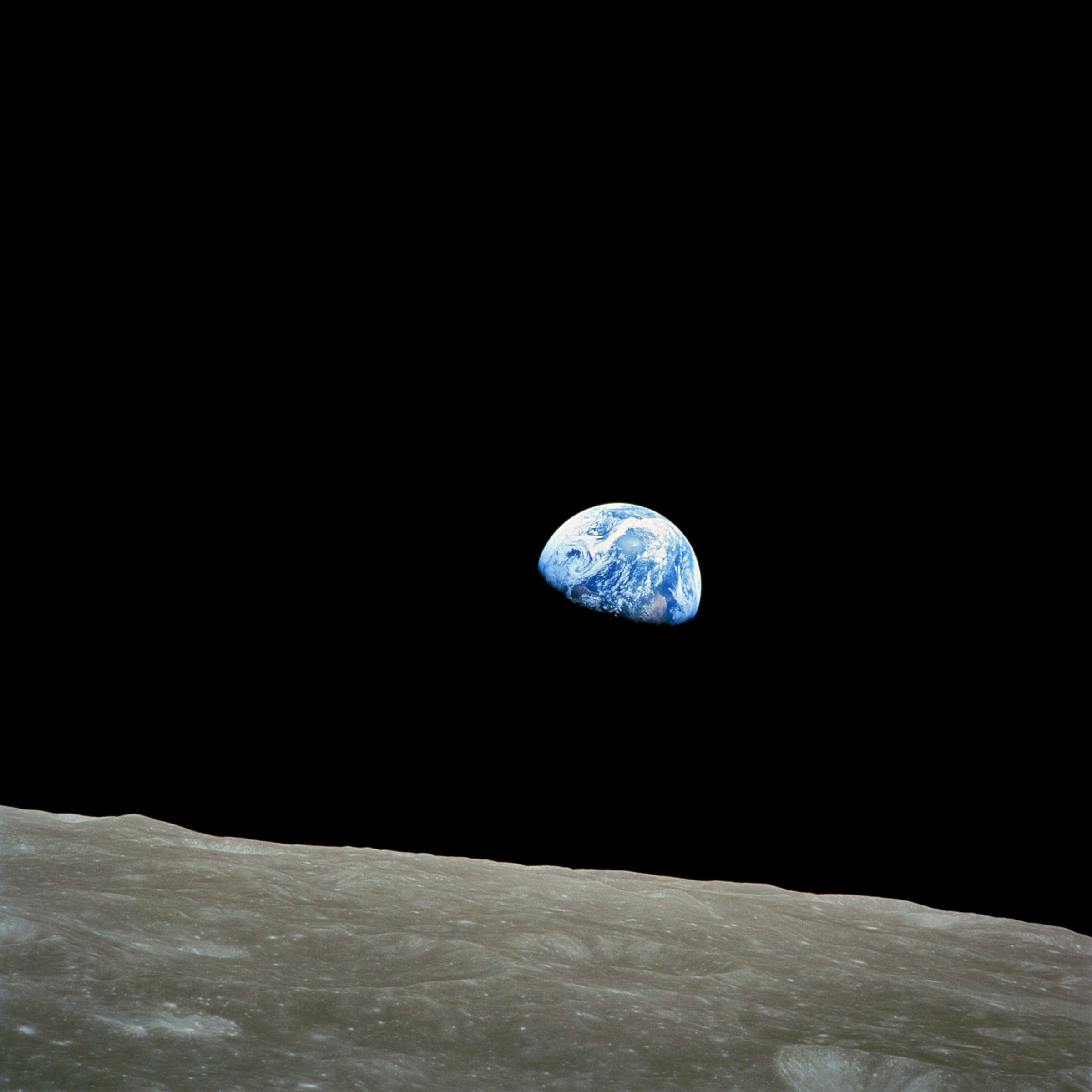

Apollo 11

- July 21, 1969 – The much reproduced full frame image AS11-40-5903 of Buzz Aldrin; happens to be the first indirect image of Earth taken by a person from the surface of another astronomical object (from the Moon), having by accident in his visor a reflection of Earth.
- July 21, 1969 – First direct image of Earth taken by a person from the surface of another astronomical object (from the Moon), (AS11-40-5923).
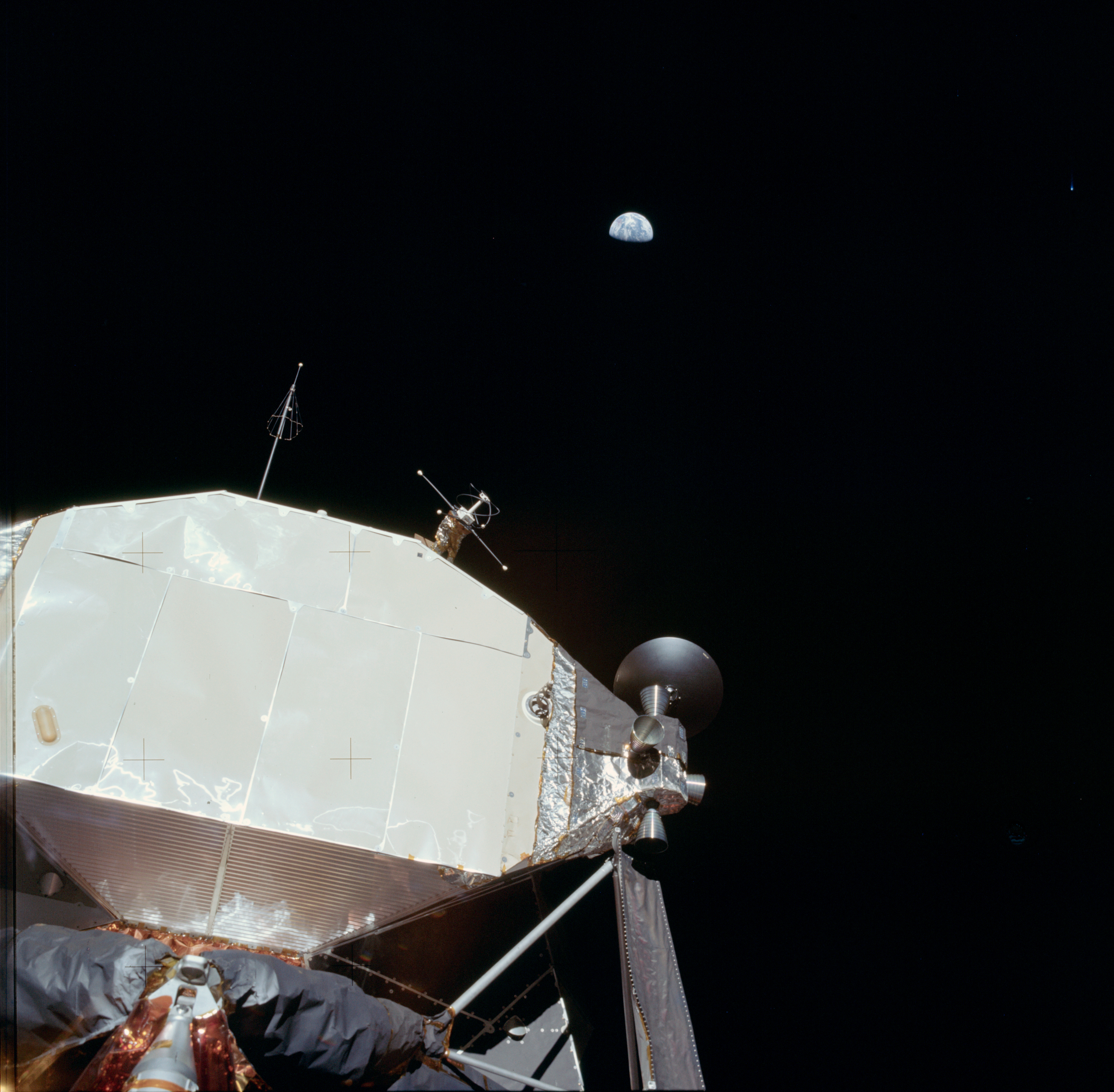

Apollo 12

- November 24, 1969 – First images (black-and-white and 16mm color film) of a solar eclipse with the Earth, taken by a human, when the Apollo 12 spacecraft aligned its view of the Sun with the Earth.
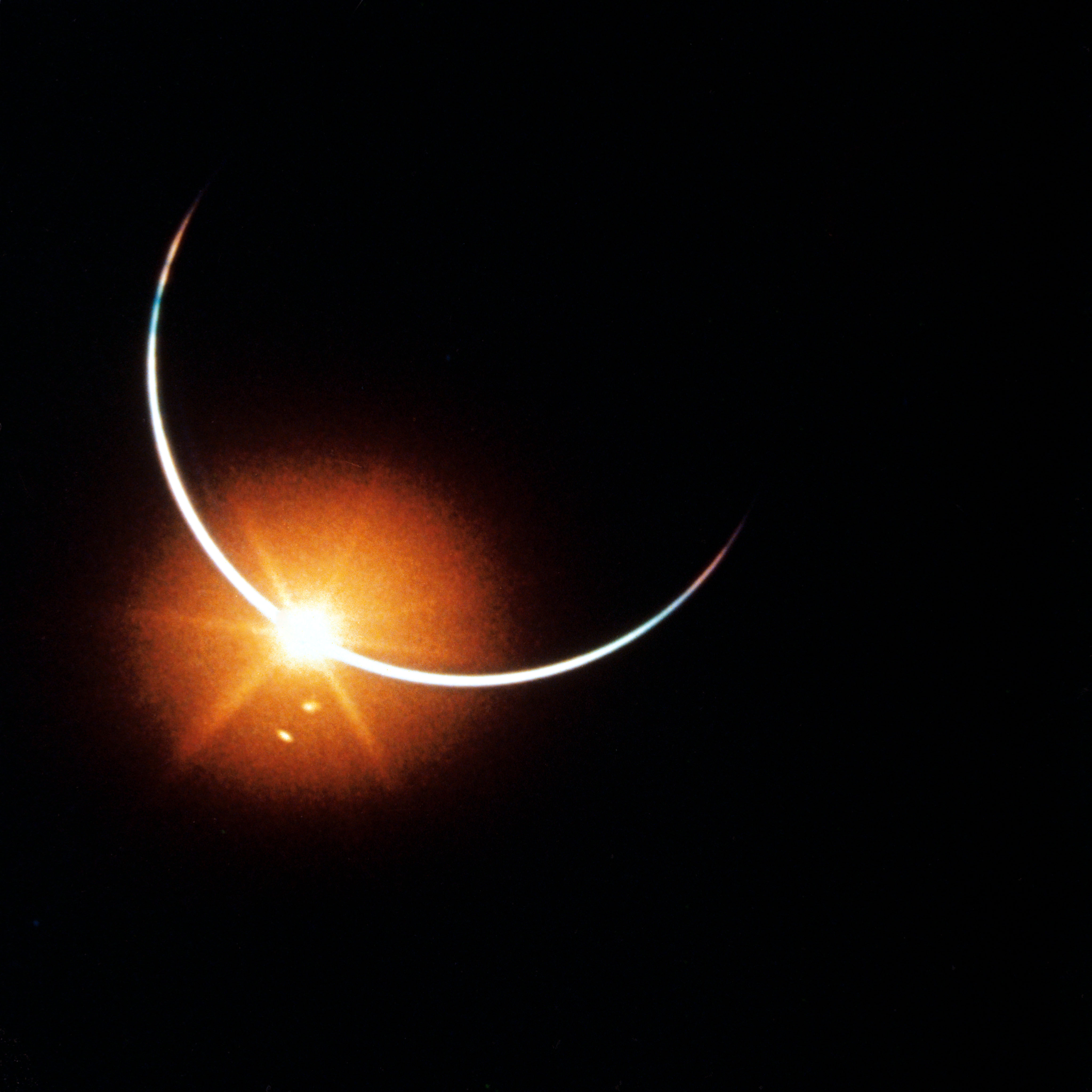

ISIS–2

- 1971 – First full image of an aurora borealis
  External image
  - image icon

Apollo 17

- December 7, 1972 – First fully illuminated color image of the Earth by a person (AS17-148-22725) and of the South Pole region, being illuminated around December solstice. This photo was taken just before another picture was taken with the same perspective, which cropped and processed became the widely used Blue Marble picture (AS17-148-22727).
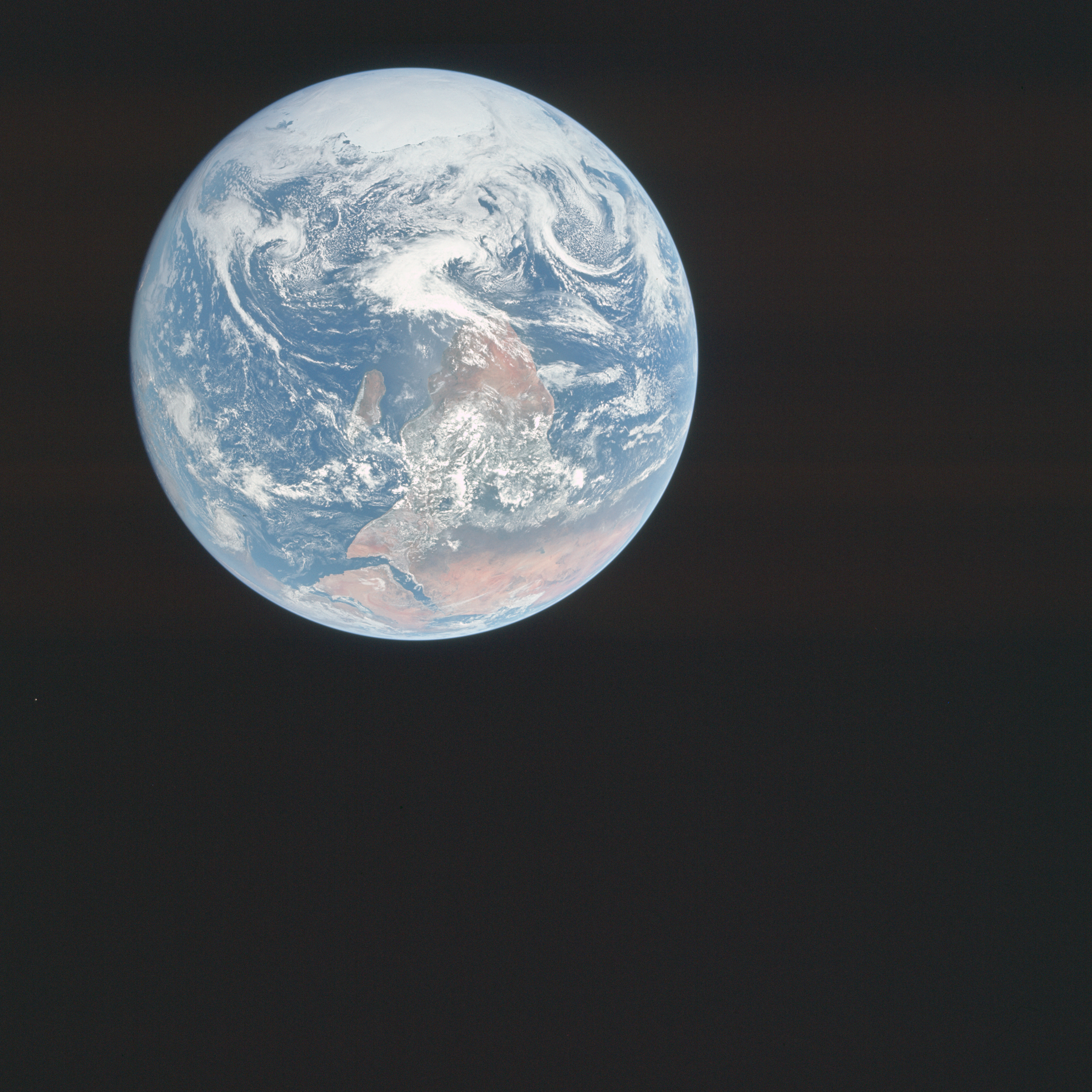

Skylab 3

- July–September 1973 – Early color image of an aurora by a human from space.
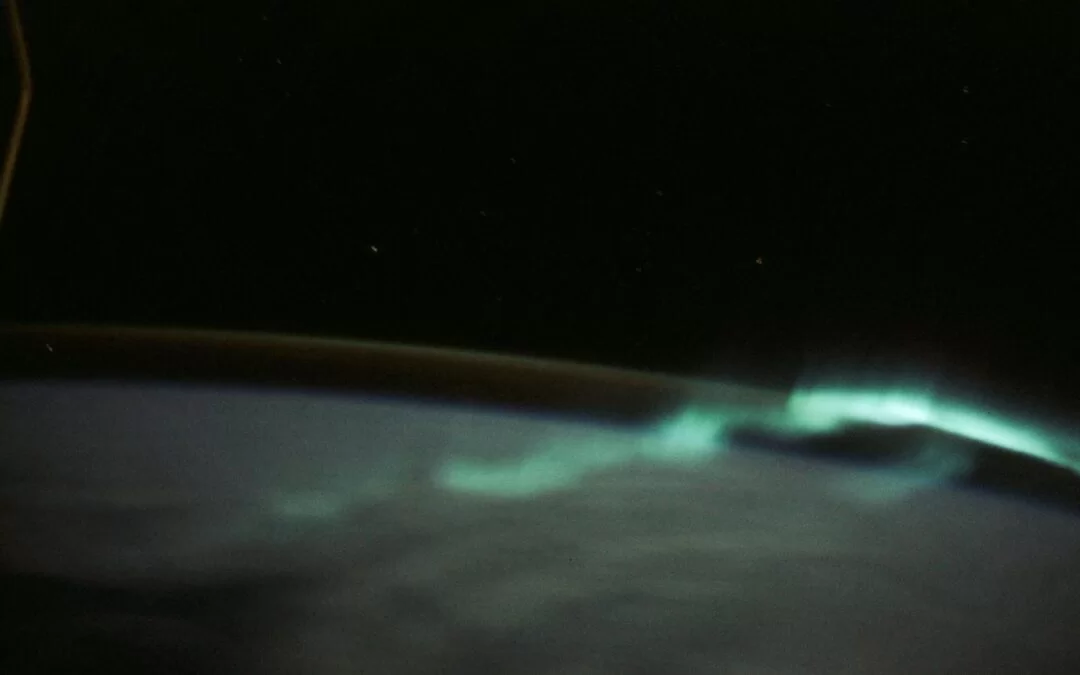

Mariner 10

- November 1973 (components) / 1999 (composition) – Mariner took the first high resolution digital color images of Earth from heliocentric orbit in interplanetary space at 2.6 million kilometers, as in this mosaic and composite size comparison image of Earth and the Moon produced in 1999 with images from Mariner 10.
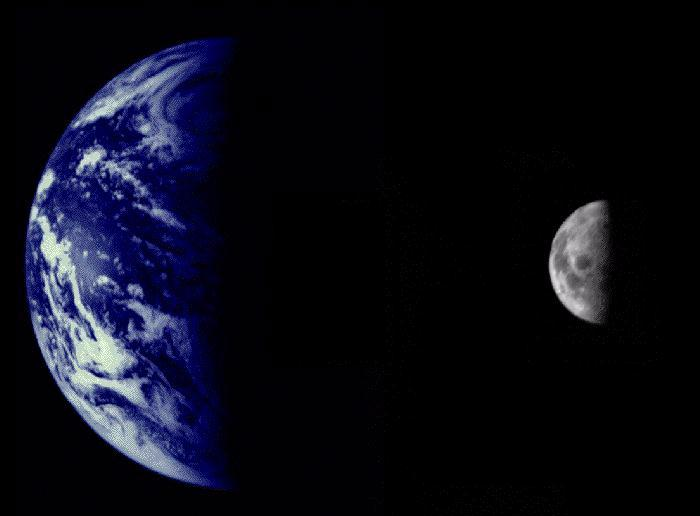

KH-11

- 1977 – First real-time satellite imagery.

Voyager 1

- September 18, 1977 – First full-disk picture and first single frame picture of Earth and the Moon together.
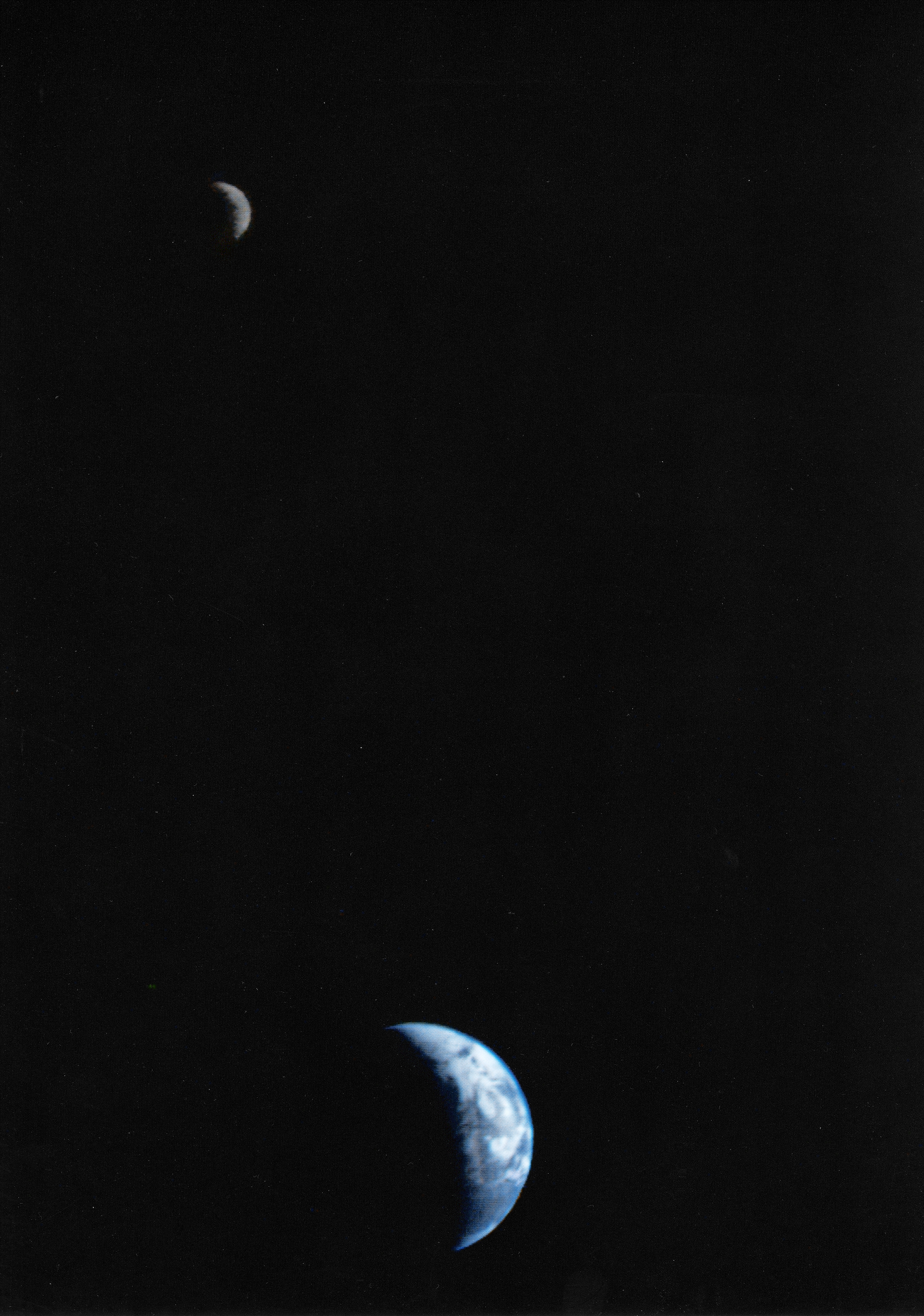
- February 14, 1990 – The Pale Blue Dot is the first image of Earth from beyond all of the other Solar System planets. It is part of the first picture of the full extent of the planetary system, known as the Family Portrait.
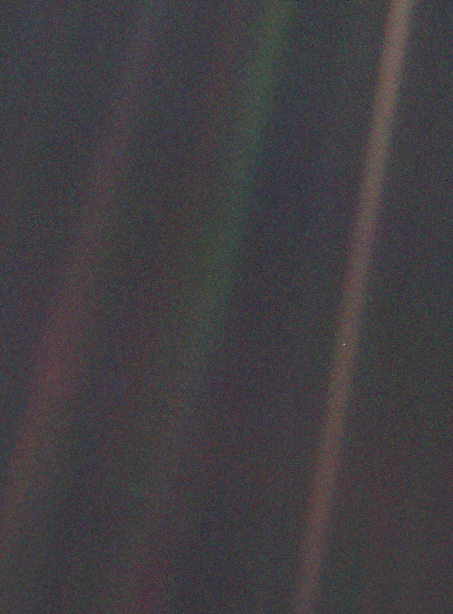

Galileo

- December 11, 1990 – First interplanetary fly-by image of Earth during the second ever Earth fly-by, which is also the first frame of the first movie of a full rotation of Earth.
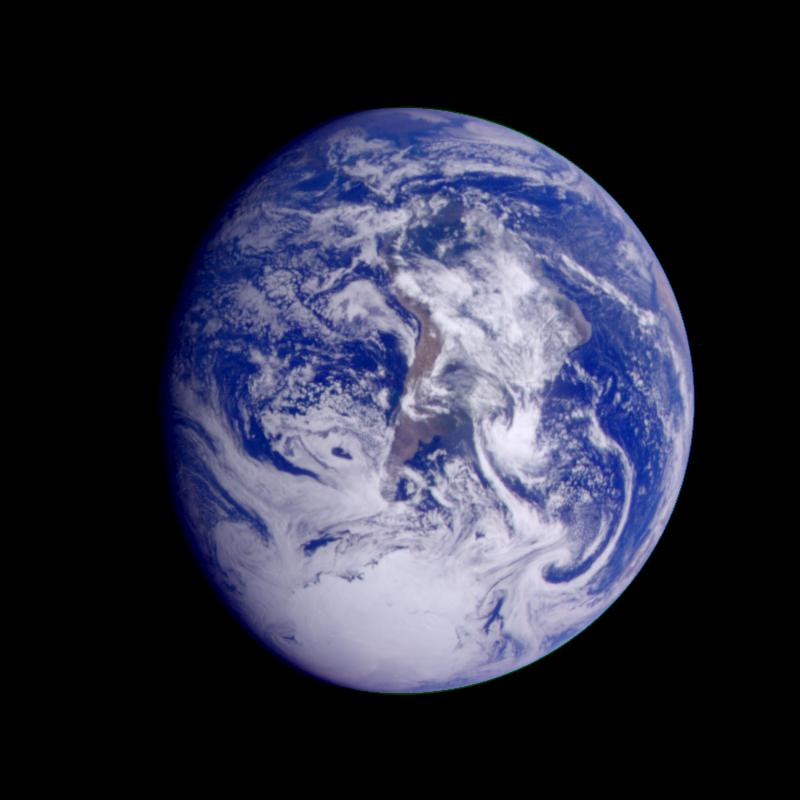

IKONOS

- October 13, 1999 – First commercial high-resolution (sub-meter) satellite photography (non-classified); it made the cover of The New York Times.
  External image
  - image icon

Mars Global Surveyor

- May 8, 2003 13:00 UTC – First image of Earth (and the Moon) from another planet (in orbit around Mars); notice South America is visible.
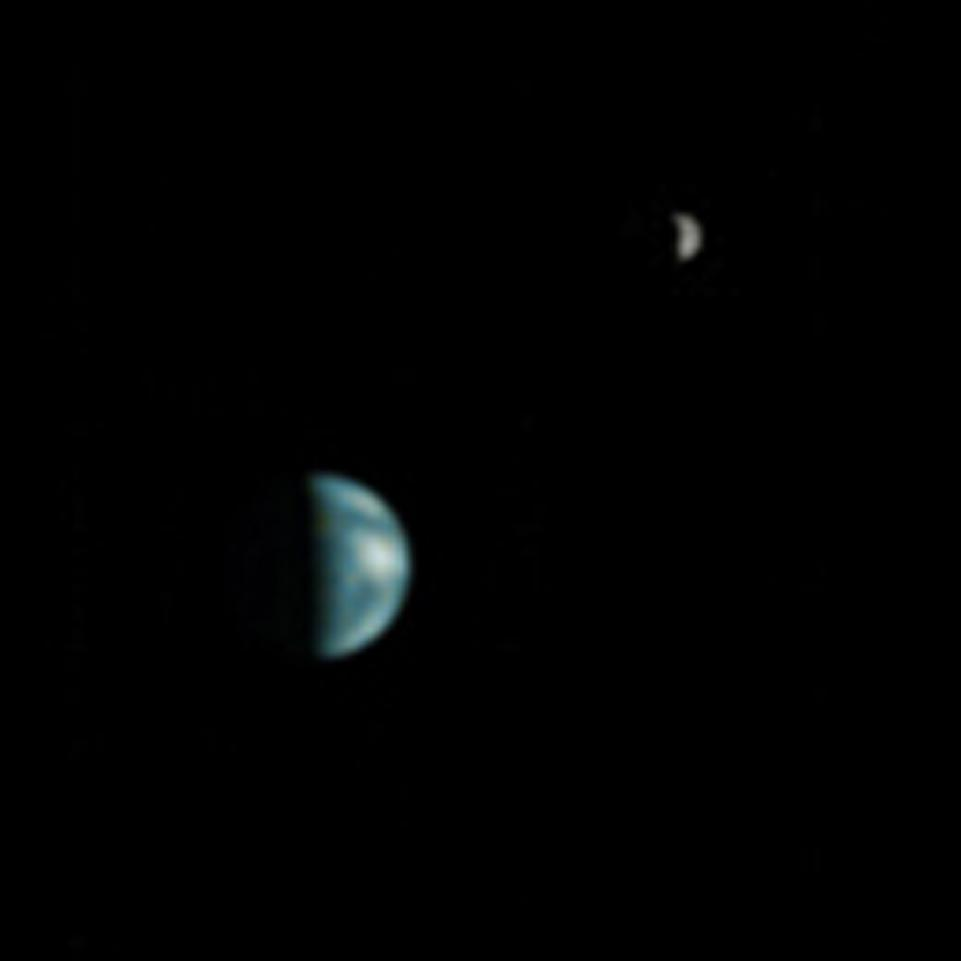

Spirit Mars Exploration rover

- March 11, 2004 – First image taken of Earth from the surface of Mars and any celestial body other than the Moon.
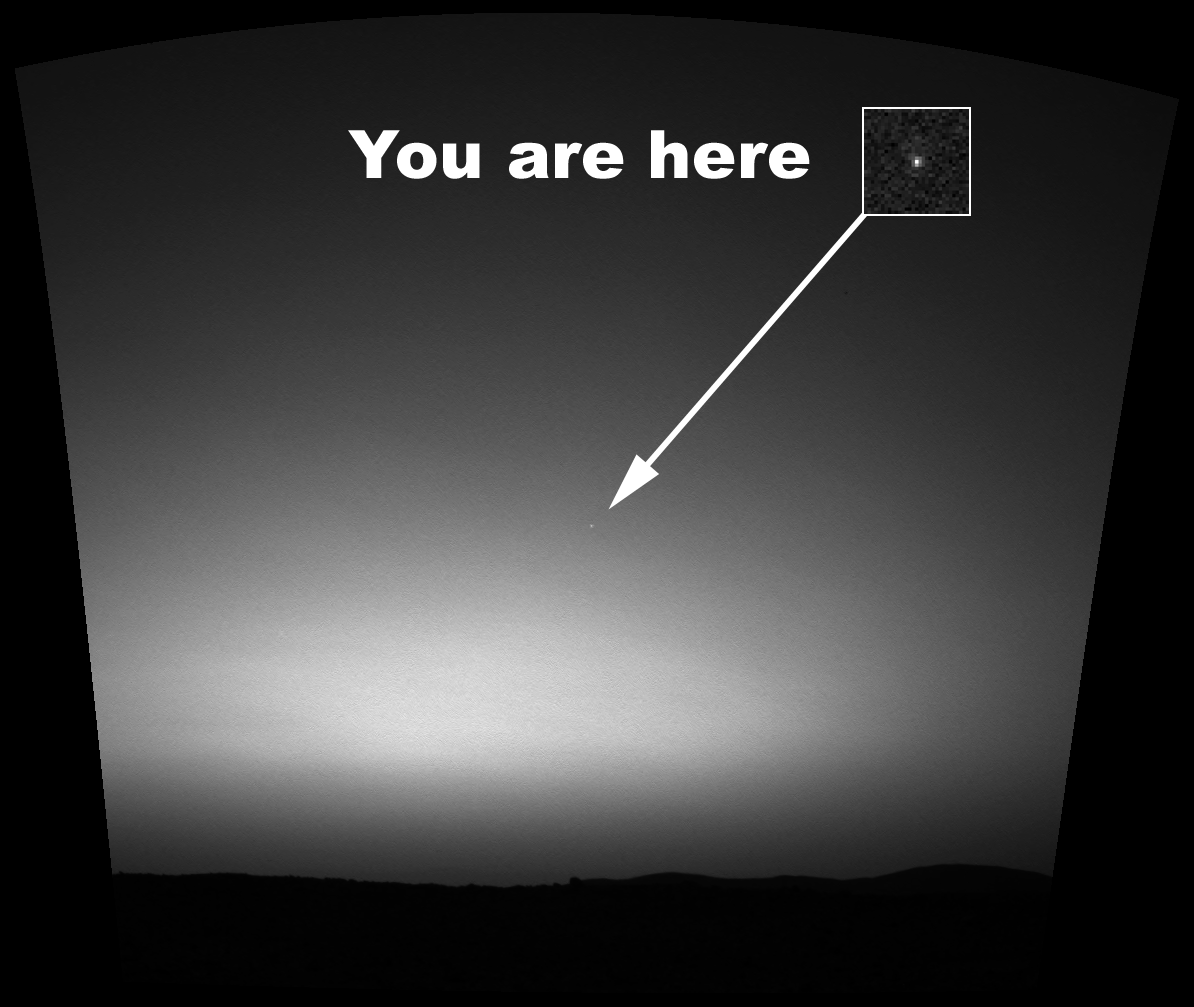

Cassini–Huygens

- July 27, 2006 – The Pale Blue Orb is the first image of Earth from Saturn.
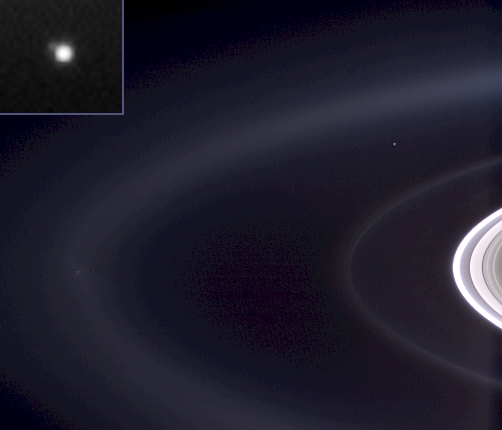

Parker Solar Probe

- August 9, 2021 – Image and video of Earth from within the outer solar corona, taken during the second time that any probe has ever reached the corona.
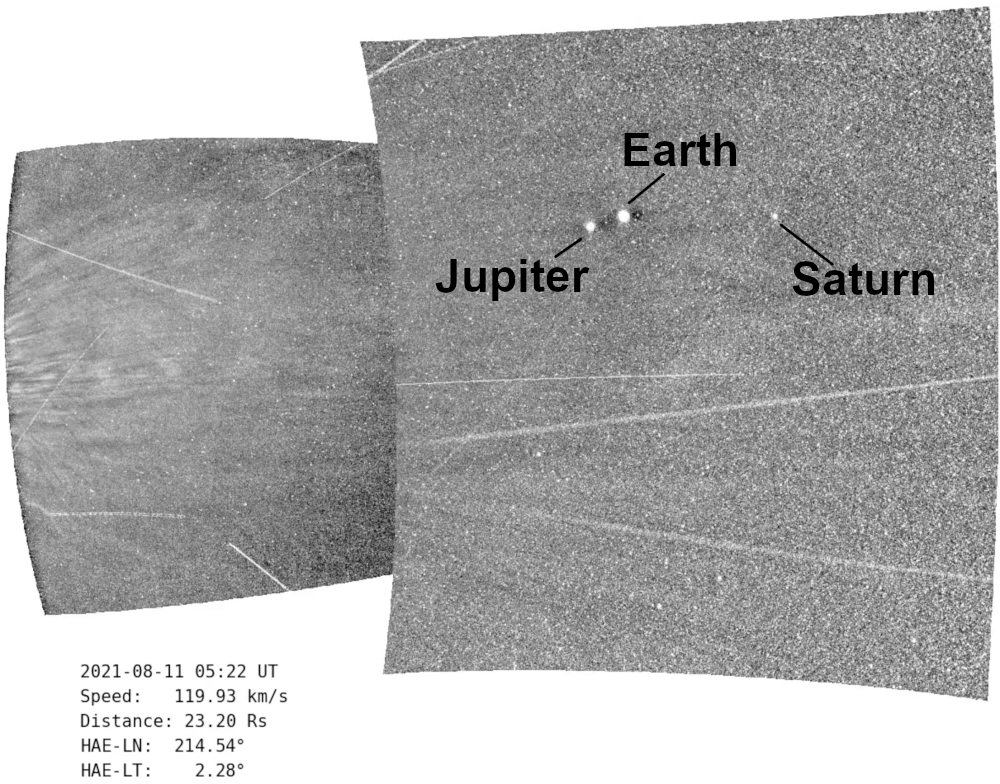

Curiosity

- September 5, 2024 – First image of Earth with Phobos (from the surface of Mars).
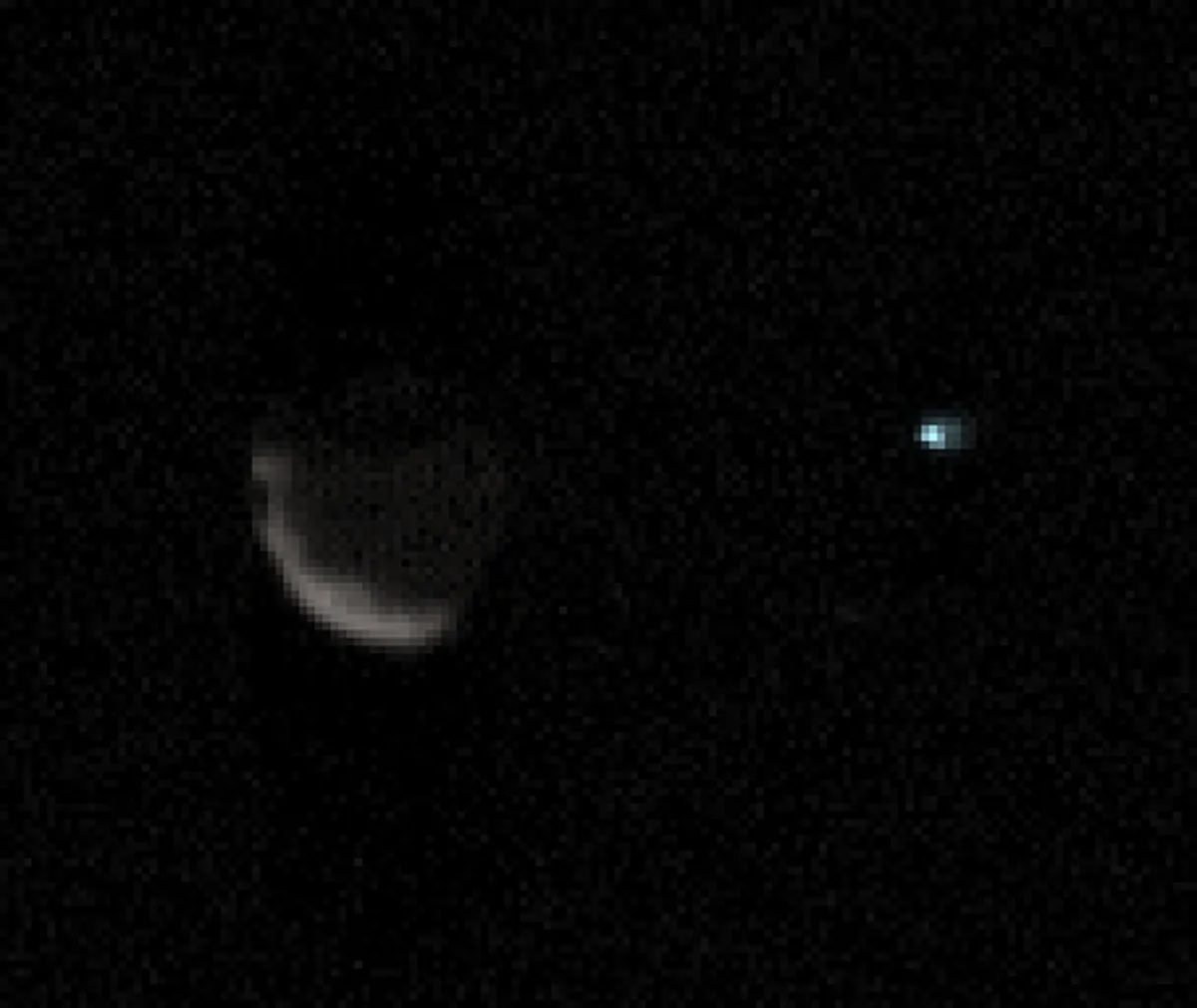

Reid Wiseman (Artemis II)

- April 3, 2026 – Hello, World, the first published full-disk photo of Earth taken by a human since 1972, is the first taken by a human to show Earth's night side illuminated by moonlight, with city lights, airglow, two auroras, afterglow, and zodiacal light. The photograph also includes Venus.

Christina Koch (Artemis II)

- April 6, 2026 – Known as Earthset, this is the first photograph taken by a human to show the Moon and Earth in the same frame from thousands of miles beyond the Moon.

Image	Date	Craft or mission	Event
	October 24, 1946	V-2	First images of Earth from outer space, flight monitoring continuous imaging, resulting in a timelapse-movie reel. Not published as Earth observation images until 1950. Taken by the V-2 No. 13 suborbital spaceflight, the eighth successful US spaceflight and one of the first over-all.
	March 7, 1947	V-2	First dedicated and first published Earth observation images from outer space, first published on March 25, 1947.
	July 26, 1948	V-2	First prepared wide-angle panorama of Earth from outer space.
	October 5, 1954	Aerobee AJ10-24 RTV-N-10b	The first color image from space as part in the left corner of this first color photomosaic of Earth from space, composed of 117 images taken from an altitude of 100 miles (160 km).
	February–March 1959	Vanguard 2	First attempt of a scanner, in which a single photocell mounted at the focus of telescope would scan Earth due to the satellite movement; resulting images were poor.
	August 14, 1959	Explorer 6	First image of Earth from orbit, showing a sunlit area of the Central Pacific Ocean and its cloud cover.
	1959	Explorer 7	The first "coarse maps of the solar radiation reflected by the Earth and the infrared radiation emitted by the Earth", from a mission launched on October 13, 1959.
	1960	TIROS-1	First television image of Earth from space and first weather satellite picture.
	August 18, 1960	CORONA	"First space-based Earth observation system"; its first successful mission was Discoverer 14 on 19 August 1960 with the recovery of photographic film from an orbiting satellite.
External image: image icon	August 6, 1961	Vostok 2	First image, color images and movie of Earth from space taken by a person, by cosmonaut Gherman Titov – the first photographer from space.
Dmiddeclass2senegalafrica	1963	KH-7 Gambit	First high-resolution (sub-meter spatial resolution) satellite photography (classified).
	1964	Quill	First radar images of Earth from space, using a synthetic aperture radar (SAR). This shows part of Richmond, Virginia.
See article	March 18, 1965	Voskhod 2	First image and movie of Earth with a human (Alexei Leonov) floating in space (the first ever EVA).
External image: image icon; |	March 18, 1965	Voskhod 2	First drawing of Earth from space and art made in space (by Leonov, the first artist in space).
External image: image icon	May 30, 1966	Molniya 1–3	First full-disk pictures of the Earth, published in Review of Popular Astronomy July–August.
	August 23, 1966	Lunar Orbiter 1	First image of Earth while orbiting another astronomical object (the Moon) and first picture of both Earth and the Moon from space. The image (frame 1102; image 102 of Lunar Orbiter 1) consists of three parts h1-h3. Since its original publication its raw analog data has been used to digitally produce the image (including its wide angle version) in higher resolution (see) and clarity (see).
	December 11, 1966	ATS-1	First picture of both Earth and the Moon from the Earth's orbit.
	December 11, 1966	ATS-1	First full-disk pictures of the Earth from a geostationary orbit.
	January 1967	ATS-1	First movie of Earth from space made without a human camera operator (contrast to Titov's 1961 movie).
	April 24, 1967	Surveyor 3	First images showing both sunset and sunrise over Earth at the same time, taken from the Moon's surface during a solar eclipse caused by Earth (rather than the Moon).
	April 30, 1967	Surveyor 3	First color image of Earth from the surface of another astronomical object, from the Moon's surface.
	September 20, 1967 (released November 10)	DODGE	First full-disk black-and-white filtered color picture of the Earth.
	November 10, 1967	ATS-3	First full-disk "true color" picture of the Earth; subsequently used on the cover of the first Whole Earth Catalog.
External image: 13 X 18 cm image	September 14, 1968	Zond-5	Black-and-white image of a half-disk of the Earth with Africa and Arabian Peninsula clearly visible. The images were taken approximately 90,000 km away from Earth. They were taken on the film camera with 400mm focal length.
	December 21, 1968 (December solstice)	Apollo 8	First full-disk image of Earth from space taken by a person (astronaut William Anders).
	December 24, 1968	Apollo 8	The first photograph of Earth taken by a person (William Anders) while orbiting another astronomical object (the Moon). For a colorized version see this image.
	December 24, 1968	Apollo 8	The Earthrise image is the first color image of Earth by a person (William Anders) while orbiting the Moon, moments after his black-and-white photograph.
	July 21, 1969	Apollo 11	The much reproduced full frame image AS11-40-5903 of Buzz Aldrin; happens to be the first indirect image of Earth taken by a person from the surface of another astronomical object (from the Moon), having by accident in his visor a reflection of Earth.
	July 21, 1969	Apollo 11	First direct image of Earth taken by a person from the surface of another astronomical object (from the Moon), (AS11-40-5923).
	November 24, 1969	Apollo 12	First images (black-and-white and 16mm color film) of a solar eclipse with the Earth, taken by a human, when the Apollo 12 spacecraft aligned its view of the Sun with the Earth.
External image: image icon	1971	ISIS–2	First full image of an aurora borealis
	December 7, 1972	Apollo 17	First fully illuminated color image of the Earth by a person (AS17-148-22725) and of the South Pole region, being illuminated around December solstice. This photo was taken just before another picture was taken with the same perspective, which cropped and processed became the widely used Blue Marble picture (AS17-148-22727).
	July–September 1973	Skylab 3	Early color image of an aurora by a human from space.
	November 1973 (components) / 1999 (composition)	Mariner 10	Mariner took the first high resolution digital color images of Earth from heliocentric orbit in interplanetary space at 2.6 million kilometers, as in this mosaic and composite size comparison image of Earth and the Moon produced in 1999 with images from Mariner 10.
	1977	KH-11	First real-time satellite imagery.
	September 18, 1977	Voyager 1	First full-disk picture and first single frame picture of Earth and the Moon together.
	February 14, 1990	Voyager 1	The Pale Blue Dot is the first image of Earth from beyond all of the other Solar System planets. It is part of the first picture of the full extent of the planetary system, known as the Family Portrait.
	December 11, 1990	Galileo	First interplanetary fly-by image of Earth during the second ever Earth fly-by, which is also the first frame of the first movie of a full rotation of Earth.
External image: image icon	October 13, 1999	IKONOS	First commercial high-resolution (sub-meter) satellite photography (non-classified); it made the cover of The New York Times.
	May 8, 2003 13:00 UTC	Mars Global Surveyor	First image of Earth (and the Moon) from another planet (in orbit around Mars); notice South America is visible.
	March 11, 2004	Spirit Mars Exploration rover	First image taken of Earth from the surface of Mars and any celestial body other than the Moon.
	July 27, 2006	Cassini–Huygens	The Pale Blue Orb is the first image of Earth from Saturn.
	August 9, 2021	Parker Solar Probe	Image and video of Earth from within the outer solar corona, taken during the second time that any probe has ever reached the corona.
	September 5, 2024	Curiosity	First image of Earth with Phobos (from the surface of Mars).
	April 3, 2026	Reid Wiseman (Artemis II)	Hello, World, the first published full-disk photo of Earth taken by a human since 1972, is the first taken by a human to show Earth's night side illuminated by moonlight, with city lights, airglow, two auroras, afterglow, and zodiacal light. The photograph also includes Venus.
	April 6, 2026	Christina Koch (Artemis II)	Known as Earthset, this is the first photograph taken by a human to show the Moon and Earth in the same frame from thousands of miles beyond the Moon.

== See also ==
- List of notable images of Earth from space
- List of photographs considered the most important
- Aerial photography – Taking images of the ground from the air
- Earth observation – Information about the Earth environment
- Earth in culture – Cultural perspectives about Earth
- Earth phase – Phases of Earth as seen from the Moon
- Extraterrestrial sky – Extraterrestrial view of outer space
- Hemispheres of Earth – Division of the globe into equal halves
- Overview effect – Cognitive shift after seeing Earth from space
- Satellite imagery – Images taken from an artificial satellite
- Space selfie – Self-portrait photo taken in outer space
- View of Earth from Mars – Extraterrestrial view of outer space
- World map – Map of most or all of the surface of the Earth
