= Earth in culture =

Cultural perspectives about Earth

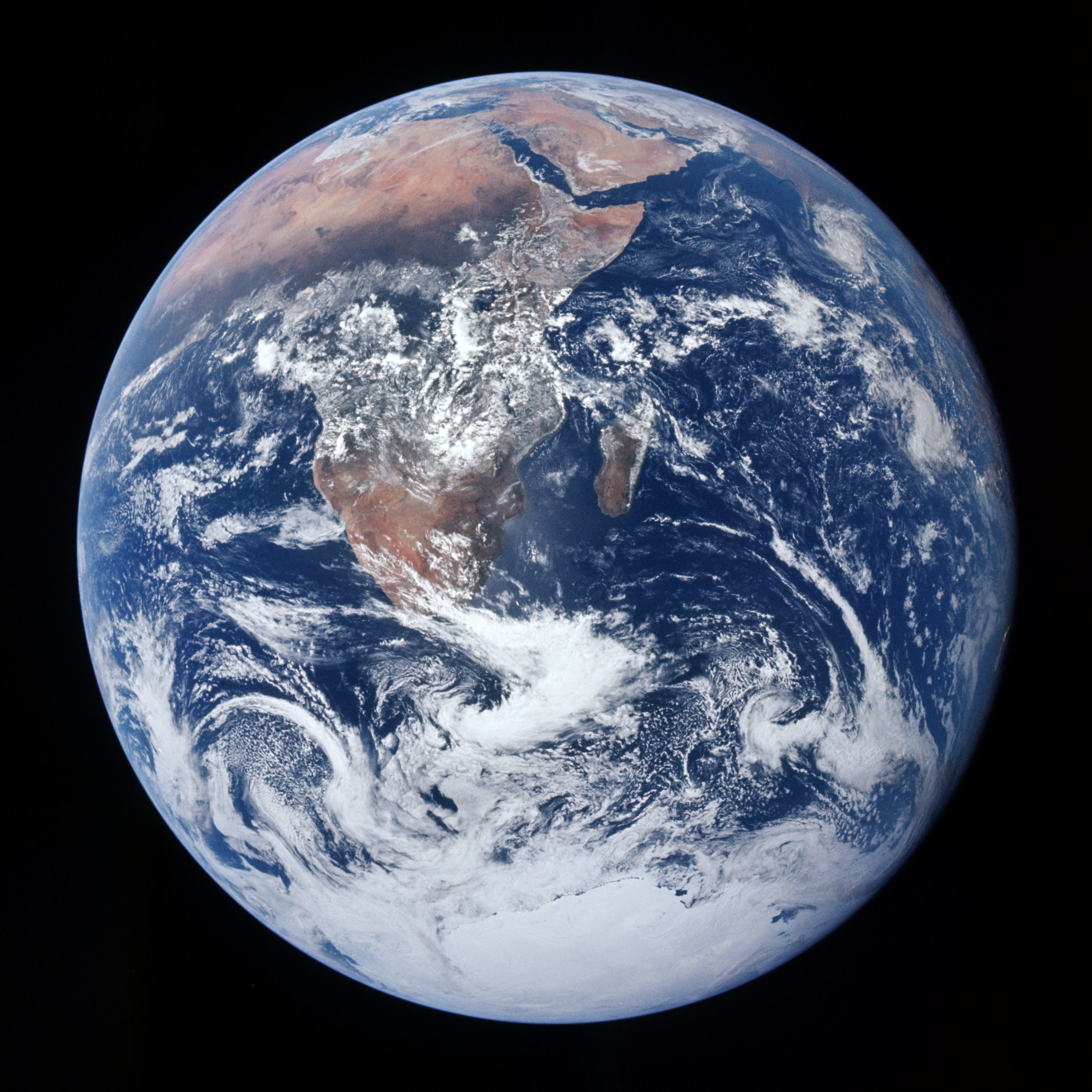
The Blue Marble photograph of Earth, taken on the Apollo 17 lunar mission in 1972.

The cultural perspective on Earth, or the world, varies by society and time period. Religious beliefs often include a creation belief as well as personification in the form of a deity. The exploration of the world has modified many of the perceptions of the planet, resulting in a viewpoint of a globally integrated ecosystem. Unlike the remainder of the planets in the Solar System, mankind did not perceive the Earth as a planet until the sixteenth century.

== Etymology ==
Unlike the other planets in the Solar System, in English, Earth does not directly share a name with an ancient Roman deity. The name Earth derives from the eighth century Anglo-Saxon word erda, which means ground or soil, and ultimately descends from Proto-Germanic *erþō. From this it has cognates throughout the Germanic languages, including with Jörð, the name of the giantess of Norse myth. Earth was first used as the name of the sphere of the Earth in the early fifteenth century. The planet's name in Latin, used academically and scientifically in the West during the Renaissance, is the same as that of Terra Mater, the Roman goddess, which translates to English as Mother Earth.

== Planetary symbol ==
Four corners of the world symbol of Earth

Globus cruciger symbol of Earth

The standard astronomical symbol of the Earth consists of a cross circumscribed by a circle. This symbol is known as the wheel cross, sun cross, Odin's cross or Woden's cross. Although it has been used in various cultures for different purposes, it came to represent the compass points, Earth and the land. Another version of the symbol is a cross on top of a circle; a stylized globus cruciger that was also used as an early astronomical symbol for the planet Earth.

== Religious beliefs ==
Earth has often been personified as a deity, in particular a goddess. In many cultures the mother goddess is also portrayed as a fertility deity. To the Aztecs, Earth was called Tonantzin—"our mother"; to the Incas, Earth was called Pachamama—"mother earth". The Chinese Earth goddess Hou Tu is similar to Gaia, the Greek goddess personifying the Earth. Bhumi Devi is the goddess of Earth in Hinduism, influenced by Graha. The Tuluva people of Tulunadu in Southern India celebrate a Three Day "Earth Day" called Keddaso. This festival comes in usually on 10th,12th,13 February every Calendar year. In Norse mythology, the Earth giantess Jörð was the mother of Thor and the daughter of Annar. Ancient Egyptian mythology is different from that of other cultures because Earth (Geb) is male and the sky (Nut) is female.

Creation myths in many religions recall a story involving the creation of the world by a supernatural deity or deities. A variety of religious groups, often associated with fundamentalist branches of Protestantism or Islam, assert that their interpretations of the accounts of creation in sacred texts are literal truth and should be considered alongside or replace conventional scientific accounts of the formation of the Earth and the origin and development of life. Such assertions are opposed by the scientific community as well as other religious groups. A prominent example is the creation–evolution controversy.

== Creation myths in different cultures and religions ==
=== Ancient Egypt ===
In the creation myth of the Heliopolitan form of ancient Egyptian religion, Benben was the mound that arose from the primordial waters (Nu), and upon which the creator deity Atum settled. The Benben stone is associated with the top stone of a pyramid, which is called a pyramid's pyramidion (or benbenet). It is also related to the obelisk.

=== Babylonian ===
Tiāmat is a sea monster known as the monster of monsters. She is killed and her body is cut in half in order to create heaven and Earth. The upper part of Tiāmat is used to create heaven with her belly as the separation line. The lower part of her body was used to create Earth, but the way that specific body parts were used to create other things is not described.

=== Norse ===
Odin and his two brothers killed the frost-giant Ymir and took his body with them. From Ymir's body Odin and his brothers created the Earth. As Ymir's blood drained from his body, Odin created oceans and lakes, from his teeth they formed broken bits of rocks and placed them on mountains, from his bones they made boulders, his skull fashioned the sky and respectively his brain formed clouds. After Odin's creation of Earth he sent four dwarves down to each corner of the Earth one being Austri meaning east, another called Vestri meaning west, another named Nordri meaning north, and the final one named Sudri meaning south. This is where directions came from. Odin and his brothers then set out to make the first people. Odin and his brothers gathered wood from the seashore and created the first people, Ask being the man and Embla being the woman. Light and dark was the final step that Odin had to create. He took Night who is the daughter of a giant that is dark in color. Odin gave Night a chariot pulled by a horse called Hrimfaxi. He instructed Night to ride around the Earth and with her she brought darkness, from her horse's saliva dew was created. He then took Day, the son of Night and Delling of the AEsir, who was bright and attractive and gave him a chariot pulled by a horse named Skinfaxi. He instructed Day to ride around the Earth and with him he brought light and from his horse's mane streamed light.

=== Aztec ===
In the myth of the god Tlaltecuhtli, her dismembered body was the basis for the world in the Aztec creation story of the fifth and final cosmos. Before the fifth sun was created, the "earth monster" dwelled in the ocean after the fourth Great Flood. The gods Quetzalcoatl and Tezcatlipoca descended from the heavens in the form of serpents and found the monstrous Tlaltecuhtli. The two gods decided that the fifth cosmos could not prosper with such a horrible creature roaming the world, and so they set out to destroy her. After a long struggle, Tezcatlipoca and Quetzalcoatl managed to rip her body in two – from the upper half came the sky, and from the lower came the Earth. The other gods were angered to hear of Tlaltecuhtli's treatment and decreed that the various parts of her dismembered body would become the features of the new world. Her skin became grasses and small flowers, her hair the trees and herbs, her eyes the springs and wells, her nose the hills and valleys, her shoulders the mountains, and her mouth the caves and rivers.

=== Yoruba ===
In the Yoruba religion, there are many deities, but the Supreme One is called Ọlọrun and they are said to be perfect. Before Ayé (the Earth) was created there was only Ọrun (the sky or heavens) above and water, swamps, and mist below. One day, one of the deities named Ọbatala asked Ọlọrun if he could make a world out of what was below. Ọlọrun granted him permission to make a world from the things down below. Before taking action, Ọbatala consulted with Ọrunmila (the deity of divination) who told Ọbatala to get a golden chain and lower it from Ọrun to the waters below so that he could eventually return to the other deities. Ọrunmila also told him to take a snail shell with soil in it, a hen, a black cat, and a palm nut. Ọbatala heeded his words and descended down the golden chain with all of the things he was told to take. Once Ọbatala reached the waters below he poured all of the soil onto the water. He then set the hen down, who spread the soil out by pecking and scratching at it. After the soil was spread, he planted the palm nut which grew and produced more nuts which respectively grew more trees. Obatala thought that this new world needed more light, so he consulted with Ọlọrun through their chameleon servant and then Ọlọrun created the Sun and Moon and sent fire on a vulture's head for light when the Sun was gone. Ọbatala got lonely on this new world of his, so he fashioned human beings out of clay and asked Ọlọrun for help. Ọlọrun breathed life into the clay figures and humans became alive. Ọlọrun also gave life to animals, plants, rivers, and language for the people to utilize. When Ọbatala was pleased with his work he climbed back up the golden chain and lived with the other deities in the sky above.

== In fiction ==
While in general, a planet can be considered "too large, and its lifetime too long, to be comfortably accommodated within fiction as a topic in its own right", this has not prevented some writers from engaging with the topic (for example, Camille Flammarion's Lumen (1887), David Brin's Earth (1990), or Terry Pratchett's, Ian Stewart's and Jack Cohen's The Science of Discworld (1999)). The iconic photo of Earth known as The Blue Marble, taken by the crew of Apollo 17 (1972), and similar images of Earth from space, might have popularized Earth as a theme in fiction.

Additionally, it is undeniable that an overwhelming majority of fiction is set on or features the Earth. Earth as a planet has been subject to various works of literary treatments. Its climate itself is related to the entire genre known as climate fiction, and its future is a major aspect of the Dying Earth genre as well as the apocalyptic and post-apocalyptic fiction.

== Depiction of Earth ==
In the ancient past there were varying levels of belief in a flat Earth, with the Mesopotamian culture portraying the world as a flat disk afloat in an ocean. In Chinese traditional culture Earth is square shaped and the heavens are round, as in the Circular Mound Altar, the axis mundi of imperial China. The spherical form of the Earth was suggested by early Greek philosophers; a belief espoused by Pythagoras. By the Middle Ages—as evidenced by thinkers such as Thomas Aquinas—European belief in a spherical Earth was widespread.

Overview of early depictions of the world
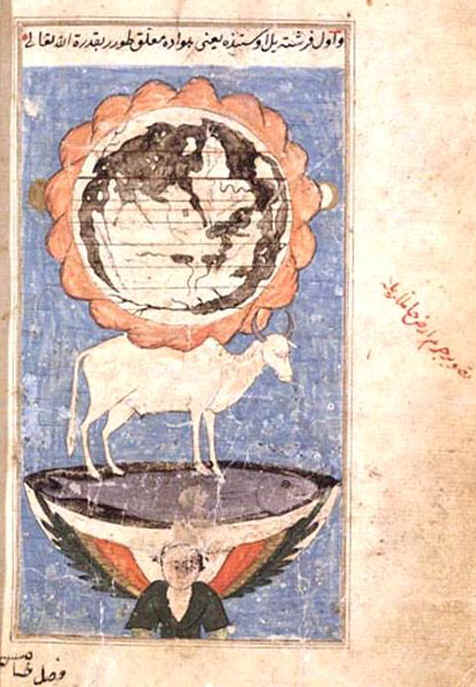
A cosmological illustration in The Wonders of Creation by Zakariya al-Qazwini showing "earth with the surrounding range of Qaf Mountains resting on the back of a giant bull (al-Rayyan), which in turn stands on a vast fish (Bahamut) held up by an Angel." This type of visualisation of the structure of the universe was not unusual in the thirteenth century.

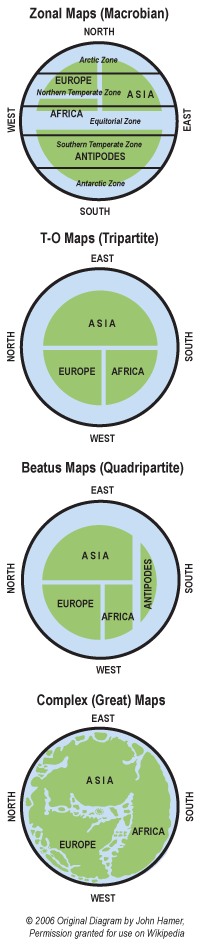
Diagram illustrating the major categories of European classical mappae mundi.

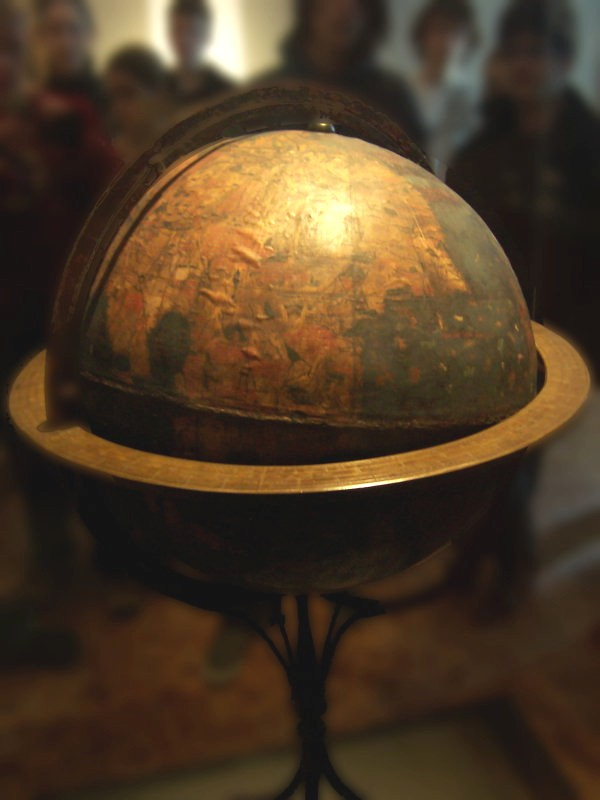
The oldest preserved terrestrial globe, Behaim's Erdapfel (between 1491 and 1493)

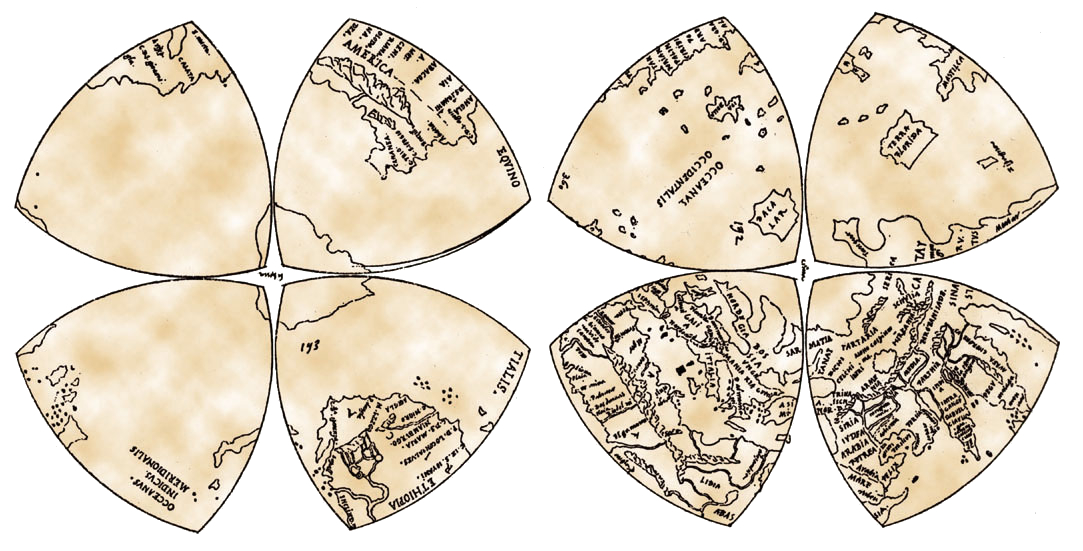
Leonardo da Vinci's world map in eight Reuleaux triangle octants (1503)

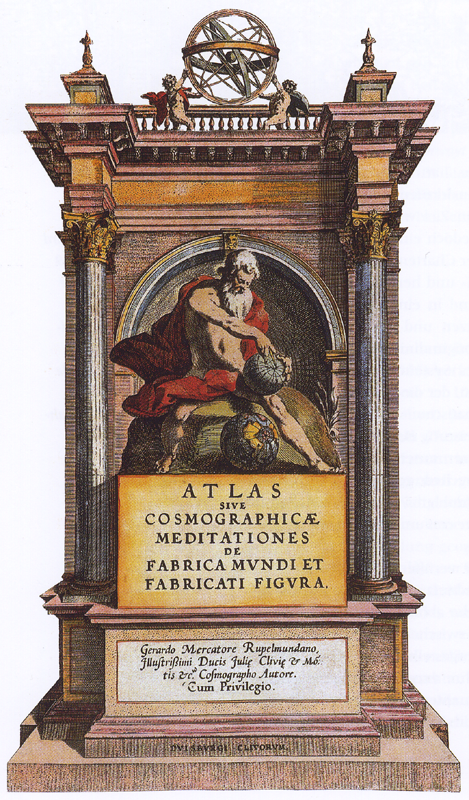
Title page of Gerhard Mercator's atlas (1595), associating such volumes of maps with the Greek mythological titan Atlas, who rested as a mountain (see Atlas Mountains and Pillars of Hercules) at the Mediterranean world's western end to the Atlas Ocean (Atlantic), and held up the sky (not Earth; here both depicted as spheres).

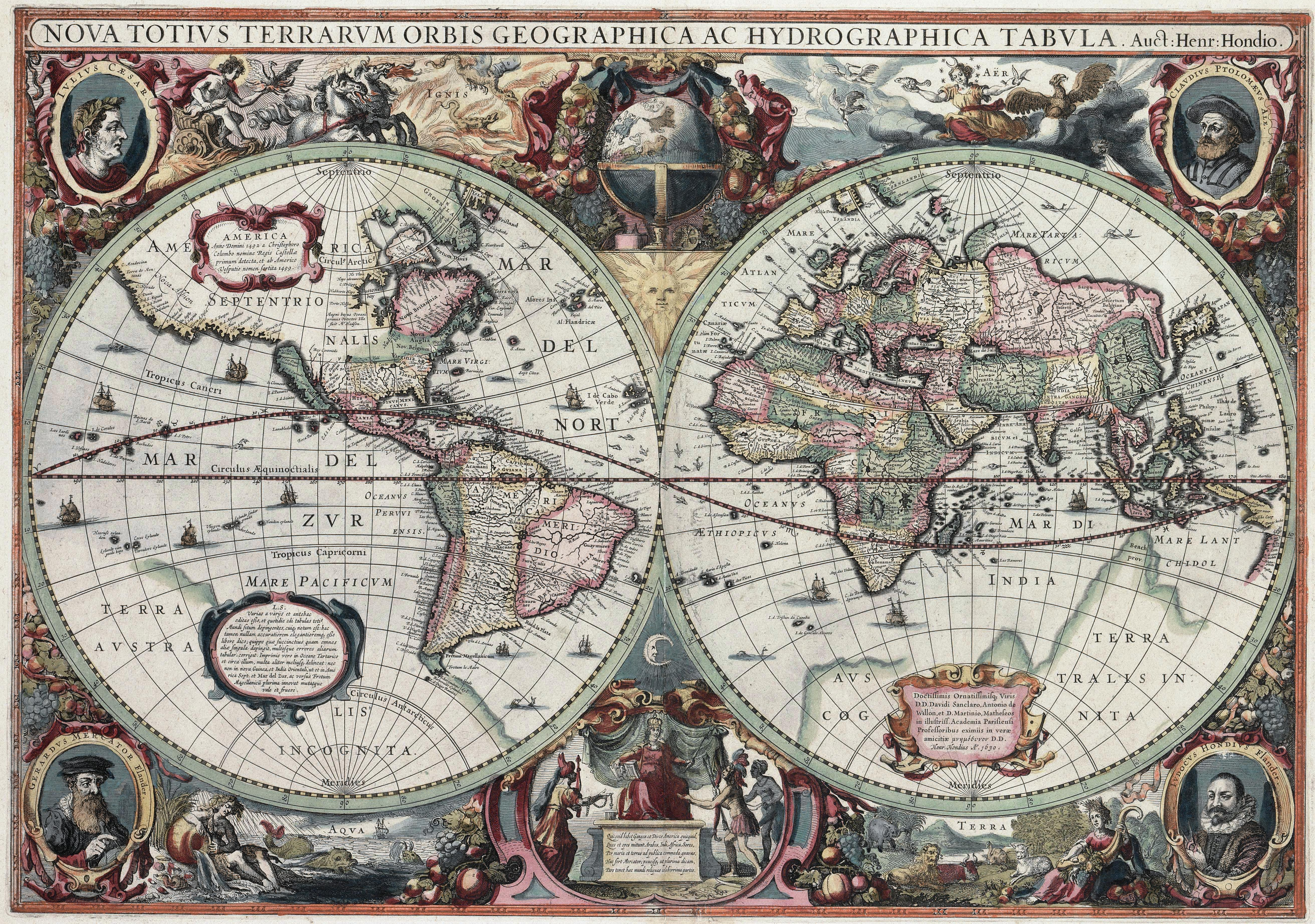
An early hemispheric map of Earth (Nova Totius Terrarum Orbis Geographica ac Hydrographica Tabula, Hendrik Hondius, 1630)

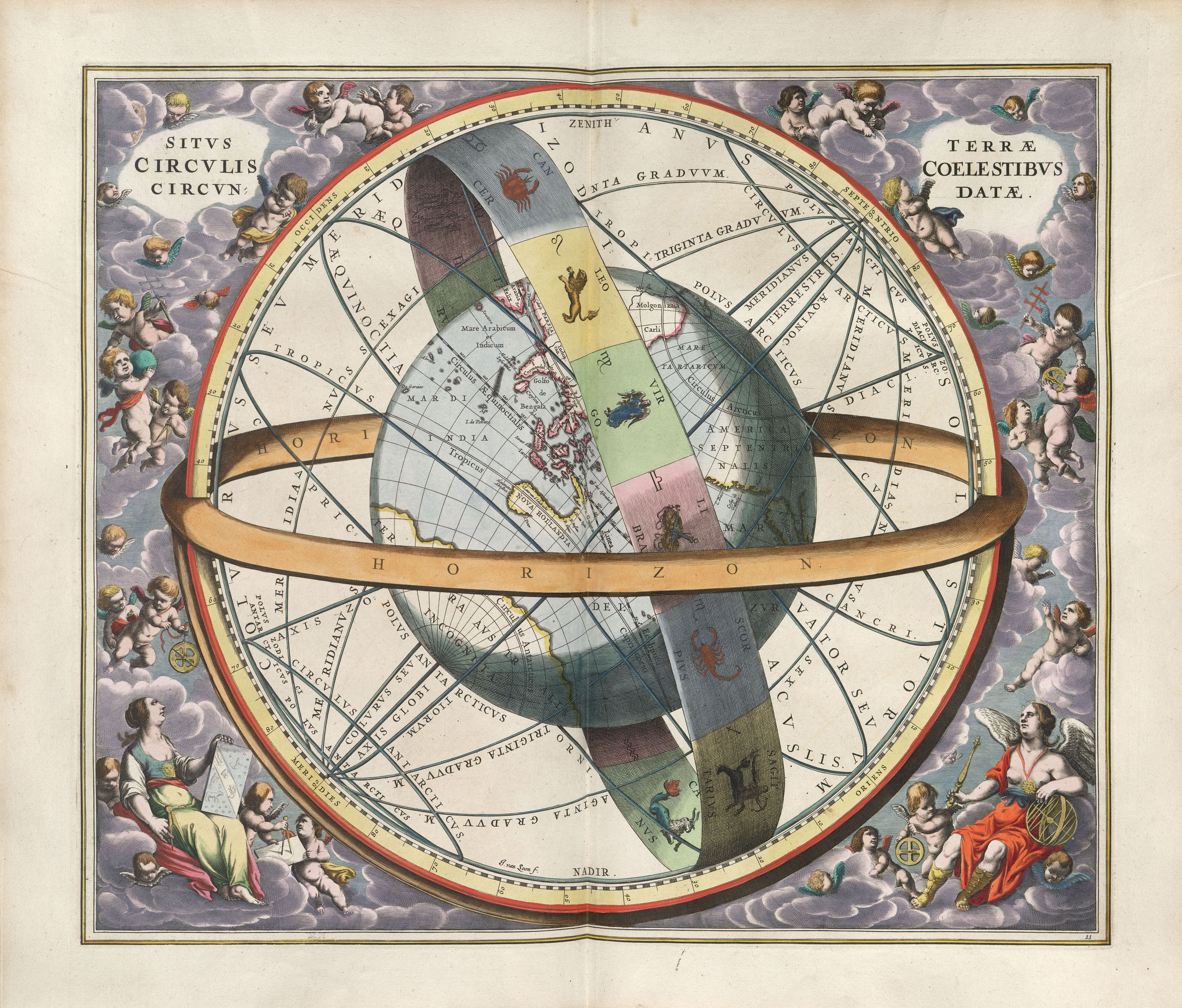
Andreas Cellarius's illustration of the Earth within the celestial sphere, from the Harmonia Macrocosmica (1660)

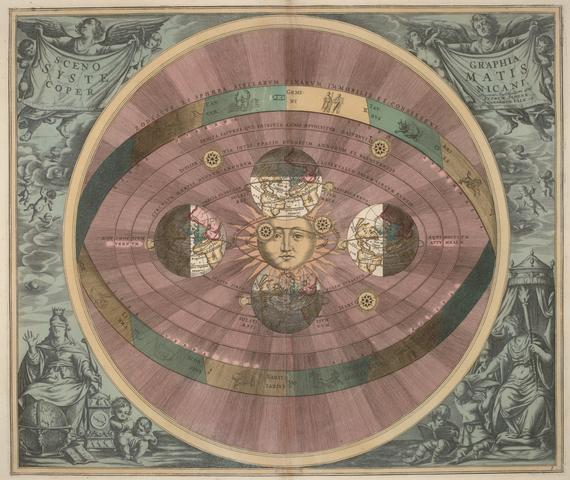
Andreas Cellarius's illustration of the Copernican system, from the Harmonia Macrocosmica (1660)

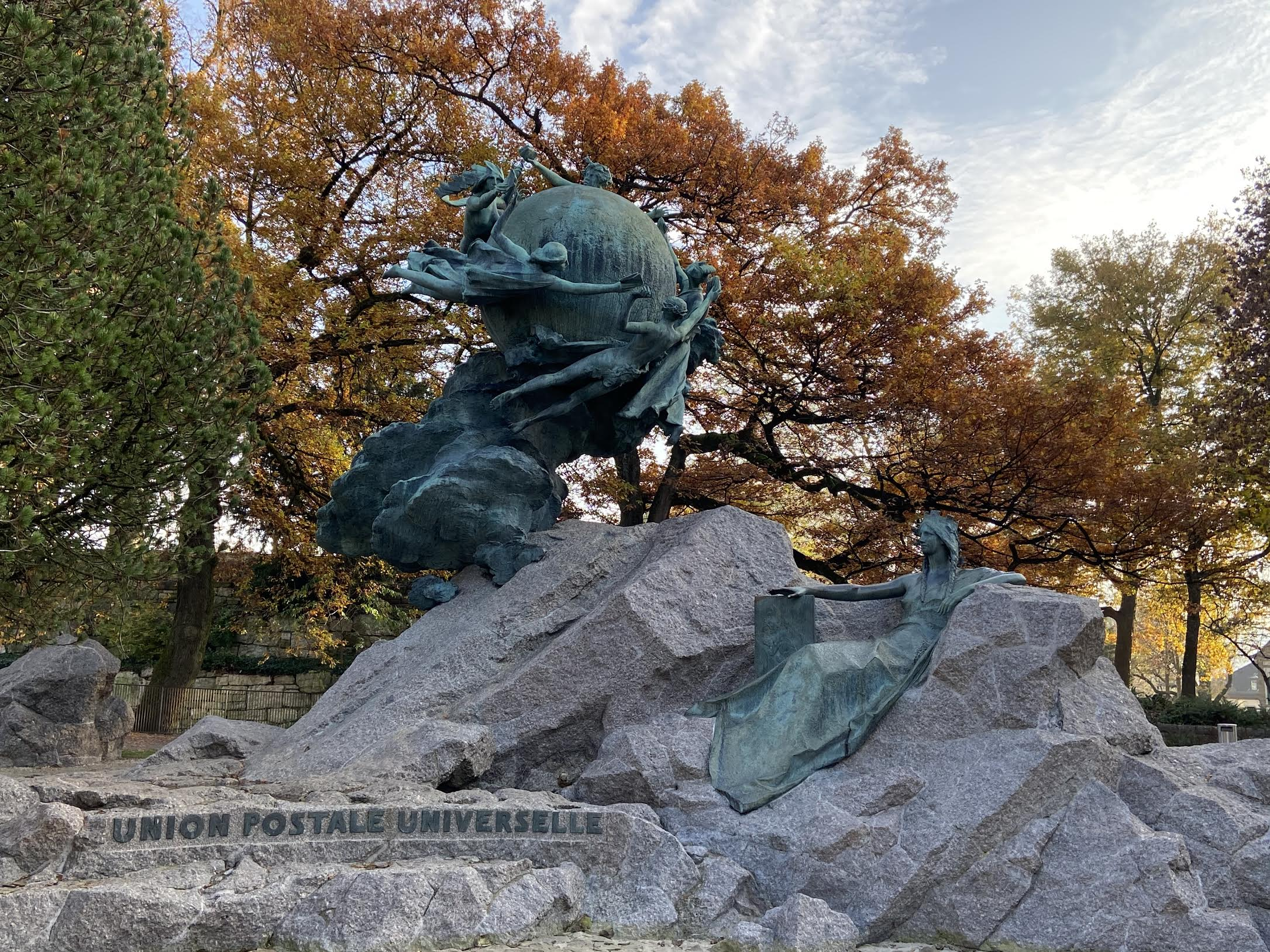
Memorial for the second oldest international organization the Universal Postal Union in Bern, a sculpture of Earth and the personified continents by René de Saint-Marceaux (1909), (Note: A postage stamp honoring the sculptor and the monument was issued jointly by Switzerland and France.) becoming in 1967 the organization's symbol.

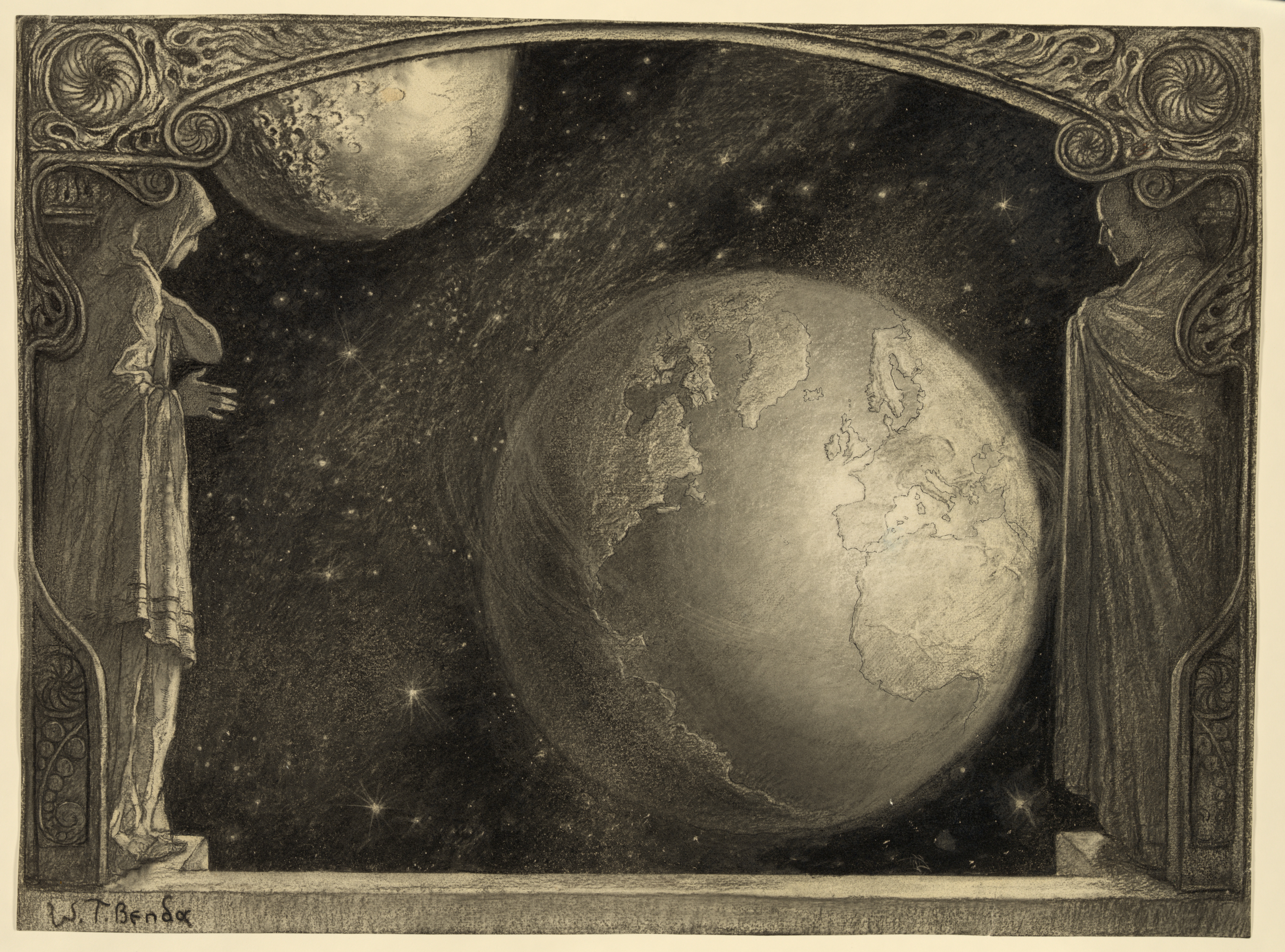
A modern depiction of Earth before any images from space (W. T. Benda, 1918).

United Nations flag (since 1947), with a circular polar projection of Earth at its center

=== Images of Earth from space ===
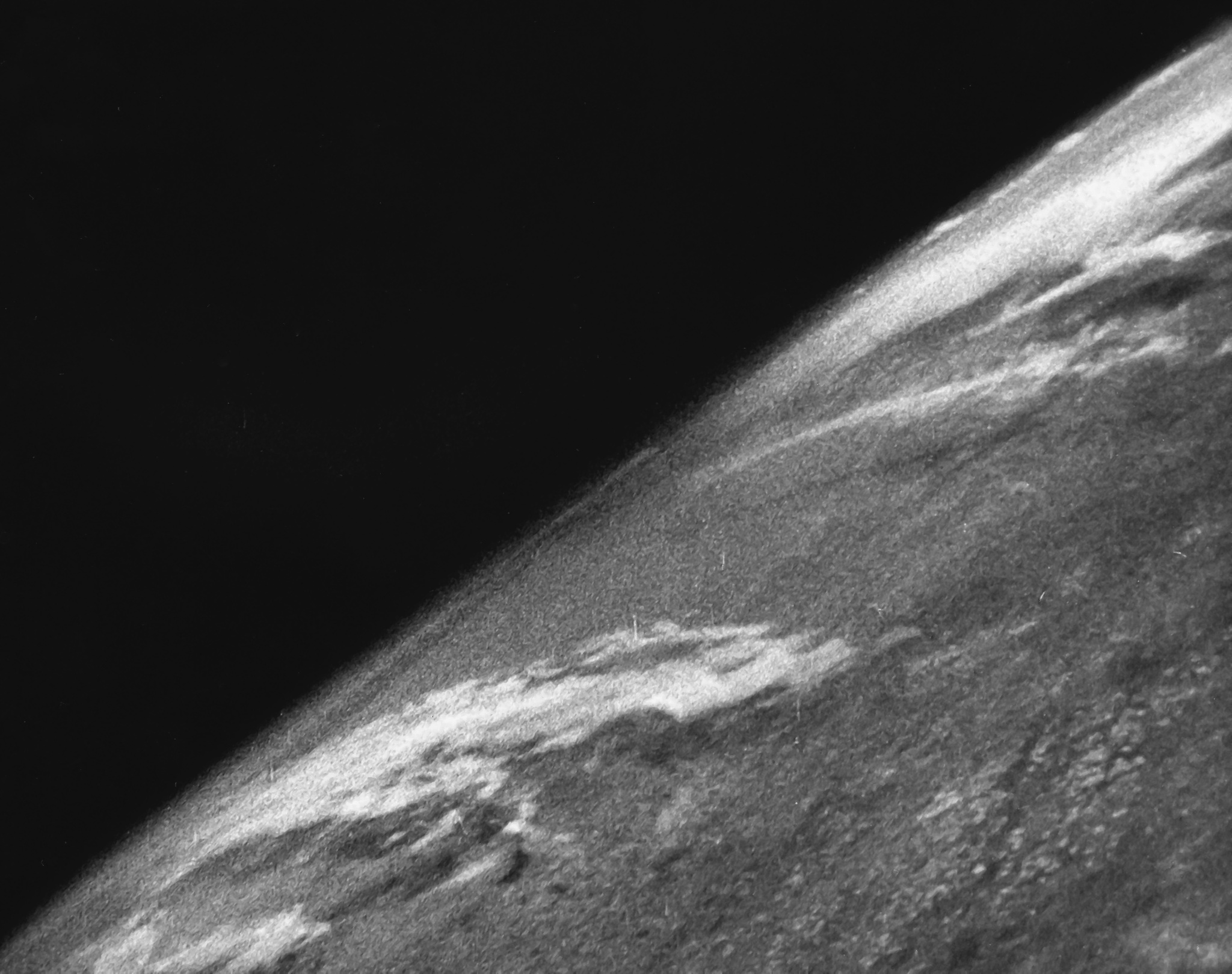
The first photo from space was taken on 24 October 1946.

The technological developments of the latter half of the 20th century are widely considered to have altered the public's perception of the Earth. Before space flight, the popular image of Earth was of a green world. Science fiction artist Frank R. Paul provided perhaps the first image of a cloudless blue planet (with sharply defined land masses) on the back cover of the July 1940 issue of Amazing Stories, a common depiction for several decades thereafter. Earth was first photographed from a satellite by Explorer 6 in 1959. Yuri Gagarin became the first human to view Earth from space in 1961. The crew of the Apollo 8 was the first to view an Earth-rise from lunar orbit in 1968, and astronaut William Anders's photograph of it, Earthrise, became iconic. In 1972 the crew of the Apollo 17 produced The Blue Marble, another famous photograph of the planet Earth from cislunar space. These became iconic images of the planet as a marble of cloud-swirled blue ocean broken by green-brown continents. NASA archivist Mike Gentry has speculated that The Blue Marble is the most widely distributed image in human history. Inspired by The Blue Marble poet-diplomat Abhay K has penned an Earth Anthem describing the planet as a "Cosmic Blue Pearl". A photo taken of a distant Earth by Voyager 1 in 1990 inspired Carl Sagan to name it and describe the planet as a Pale Blue Dot. On Earth Day (22 April) 2023, a collection of images to date of Earth taken from various deep space distances in the Solar System was published.

Since the 1960s, Earth has also been described as a massive "Spaceship Earth," with a life support system that requires maintenance, or, in the Gaia hypothesis, as having a biosphere that forms one large organism. Since 2010 the Cupola of the ISS has allowed for a wealth of intricate images of Earth from orbit.

==== Notable images of Earth from space ====
Year	Event	Image	Refs
1967	10 November 1967: NASA's first full-disc, true-color image of Earth, taken by the ATS-3 satellite. The image was used for the cover of the first edition of the Whole Earth Catalog the following year.		
1968	Earthrise, taken 12 December 1968, by Apollo 8 astronaut William Anders, shows the Earth rising over the lunar landscape as the first humans reached and orbited the Moon. It quickly became an iconic and enduring symbol of human achievement and exploration.		
1972	7 December 1972: the widely used The Blue Marble was taken by the crew of Apollo 17. The photograph's original orientation had south pointed up.		
1990	14 February 1990: the Voyager 1 space probe took the Pale Blue Dot photograph of Earth from a record distance of about 6 billion kilometers (3.7 billion miles, 40.5 AU), as part of that day's Family Portrait series of images of the Solar System. Earth appears as a tiny dot within deep space: the blueish-white speck almost halfway up the brown band on the right. Diagram of the Family Portrait showing the planets' orbits and the relative position of Voyager 1 when the mosaic was captured.		
2010	Family Portrait - taken in November 2010 by MESSENGER while orbiting Mercury		
2013	The Day the Earth Smiled - 9 July 2013 photograph of Saturn and Earth		
2026	Hello, World is a whole-Earth photograph taken by Commander Reid Wiseman on 3 April 2026 during the Artemis II mission, the first taken by a person since The Blue Marble.		
2026	Earthset was taken on 6 April 2026 by mission specialist Christina Koch of Artemis II during the first crewed mission around the Moon since 1972.		

==== Impact of images of Earth from space ====
Over the past two centuries a growing environmental movement has emerged that is concerned about humankind's effects on the Earth. The key issues of this socio-political movement are the conservation of natural resources, elimination of pollution, and the usage of land. Although diverse in interests and goals, environmentalists as a group tend to advocate sustainable management of resources and stewardship of the environment through changes in public policy and individual behavior. Of particular concern is the large-scale exploitation of non-renewable resources. Changes sought by the environmental movements are sometimes in conflict with commercial interests due to the additional costs associated with managing the environmental impact of those interests.

== See also ==
- Earth globe § History
- Flag of Earth
