= The Day the Earth Smiled =

2013 photograph of Saturn and Earth

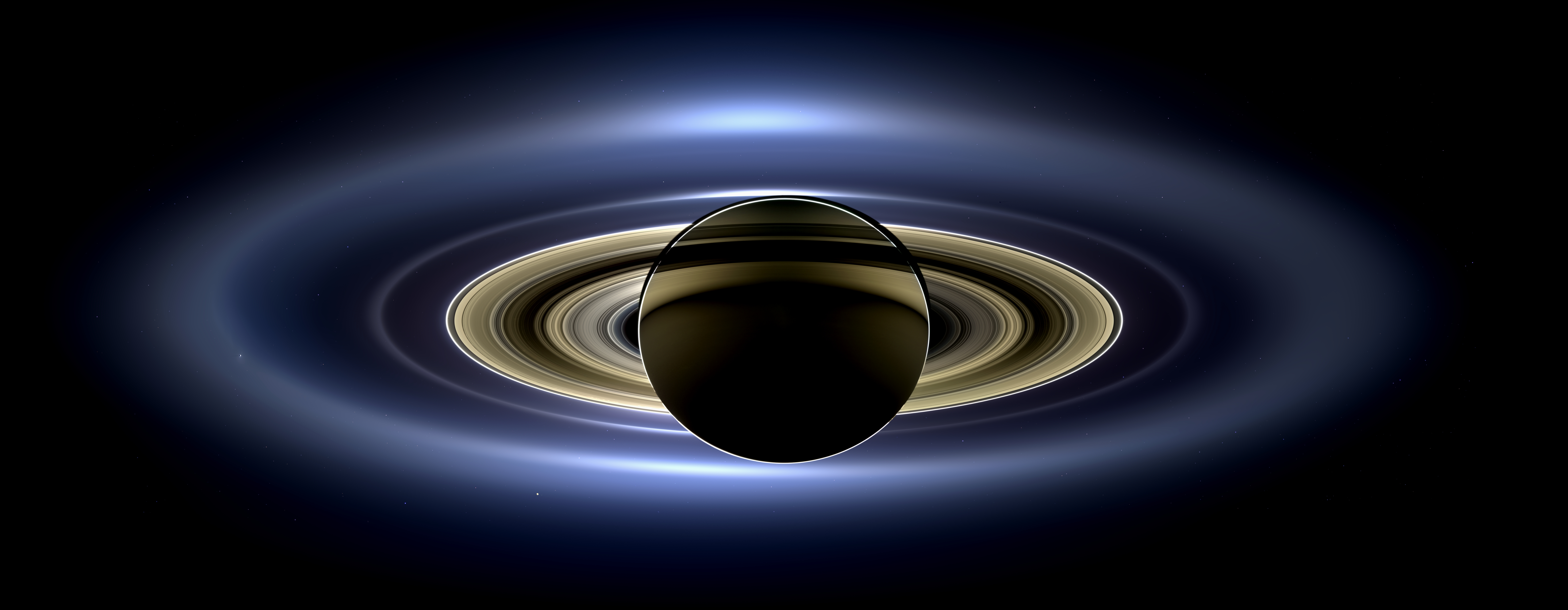
The fully processed composite photograph of Saturn taken by Cassini on July 19, 2013

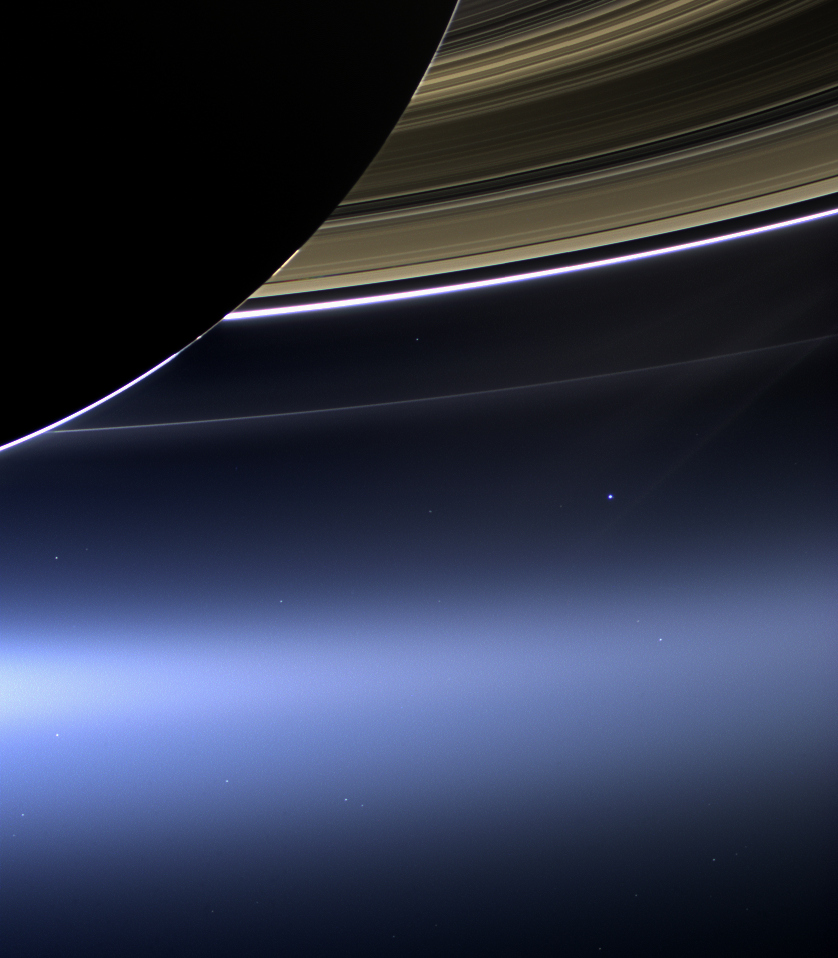
Earth can be seen as a blue dot underneath the rings of Saturn.

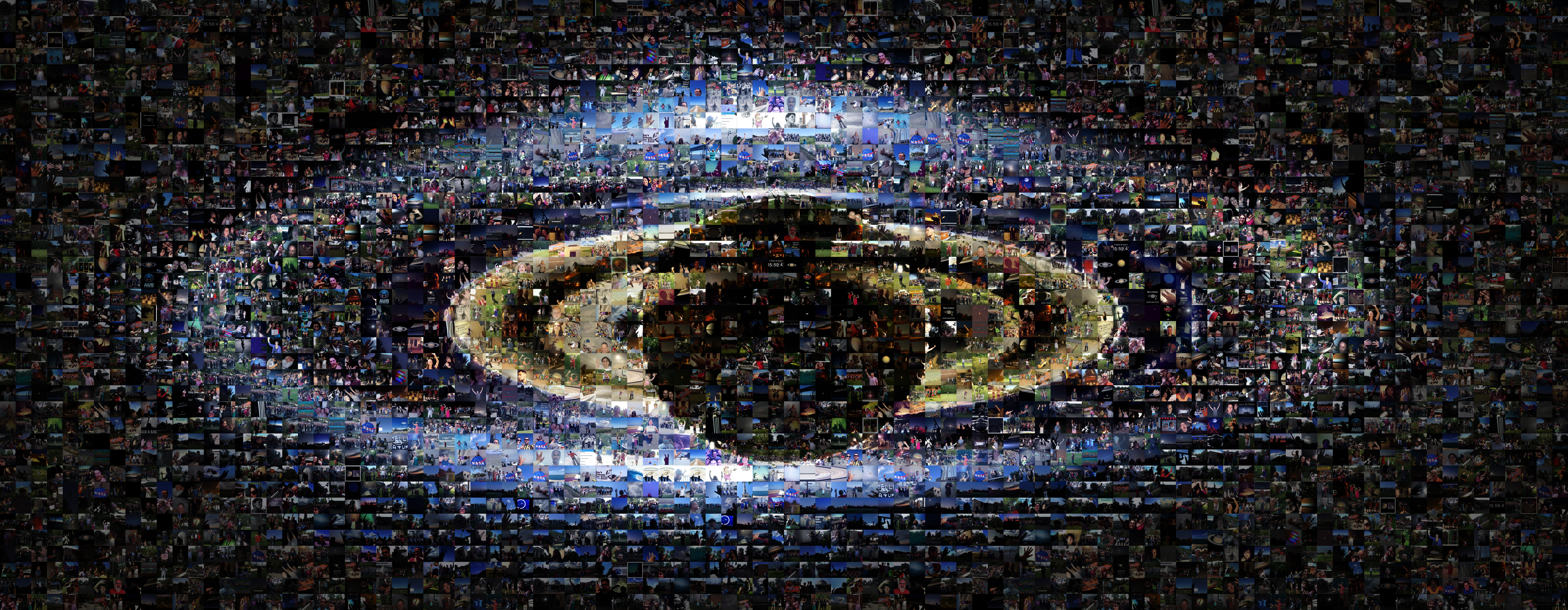
The photomosaic from NASA's "Wave at Saturn" campaign. The collage includes some 1,600 photos taken by members of the public on The Day the Earth Smiled.

The Day the Earth Smiled is a composite photograph taken by the NASA spacecraft Cassini on July 19, 2013. During an eclipse of the Sun, the spacecraft turned to image Saturn and most of its visible ring system, as well as Earth and the Moon as distant pale dots. The spacecraft had twice taken similar photographs (in 2006 and 2012) in its previous nine years in orbit around the planet. The name also refers to the activities associated with the event, as well as to the photographic mosaic created from it.

Conceived by the planetary scientist Carolyn Porco, the imaging team leader for Cassini, the concept called for the people of the world to reflect on their place in the universe, to marvel at life on Earth, and, at the time the pictures were taken, to look up and smile in celebration.

The final mosaic captured on July 19, processed at the Cassini Imaging Central Laboratory for Operations (CICLOPS), was released to the public on November 12, 2013. The photograph includes Earth, Mars, Venus, and many Saturnian moons. A higher-resolution image, depicting Earth and the Moon as distinct points of light, was taken with Cassini's narrow-angle camera and was released shortly afterwards.

== Events ==
The Cassini probe took images of Earth and the Moon from close to 1.44 billion kilometres away at 21:27 UTC, July 19, 2013. A number of activities were planned to celebrate the occasion:

- A website was set up as a portal to activities associated with July 19. On it, Porco encouraged the world to celebrate life on planet Earth and humanity's accomplishments in the exploration of the Solar System.
- Astronomers Without Borders coordinated events internationally.
- NASA spearheaded a related event called 'Wave at Saturn' "to help acknowledge the historic interplanetary portrait as it is being taken".
- A "Message to the Milky Way" contest was held by Porco's company, Diamond Sky Productions. People could submit a digital photo taken on July 19 and/or a musical composition. The winning entries were beamed as a message to extraterrestrials, "into the Milky Way from the Arecibo Radio Telescope in Puerto Rico". This follows the example set in 1974, when the first serious effort at communication to alien civilizations, the Arecibo message, was broadcast from Arecibo.

== Results ==
Raw images from Cassini were received on Earth shortly after the event, and a couple of processed images—a high-resolution image of the Earth and the Moon, and a small portion of the final wide-angle mosaic showing the Earth—were released to the public a few days following the July 19 imaging sequence.

Processing of the full mosaic took place at CICLOPS under Porco's direction over the course of approximately two months. During the four hours it took Cassini to image the entire 647,808 kilometres (402,529 mi)-wide scene, the spacecraft captured a total of 323 images, 141 of which were used in the mosaic. NASA revealed that this imaging marked the first time four planets – Saturn, Earth, Mars, and Venus – had been captured at once in visible light by the Cassini craft. It was also the first time the people of Earth knew in advance that their picture would be taken from the outer Solar System.

NASA's official release of the final The Day the Earth Smiled mosaic on November 12, 2013, was met with much fanfare in news media outlets around the world. The image was featured on the front page of The New York Times the following day. Public figures including media producer Seth MacFarlane lauded the image. The mosaic was also presented by Carolyn Porco, and dedicated to the late astronomer Carl Sagan, at a ceremony at the Library of Congress in honor of its acquisition of Sagan's papers. In addition, a collage of images submitted by 1,600 members of the public to NASA's Wave at Saturn campaign was released on November 12.

== See also ==
- The Blue Marble
- Earth Anthem
- Earth Day
- Earthrise
- Earthset
- Pale Blue Dot
- Hello, World
- Portrait of the Planets
- Solar System Family Portrait
- Space selfie
