= Carolyn Porco =

American planetary scientist

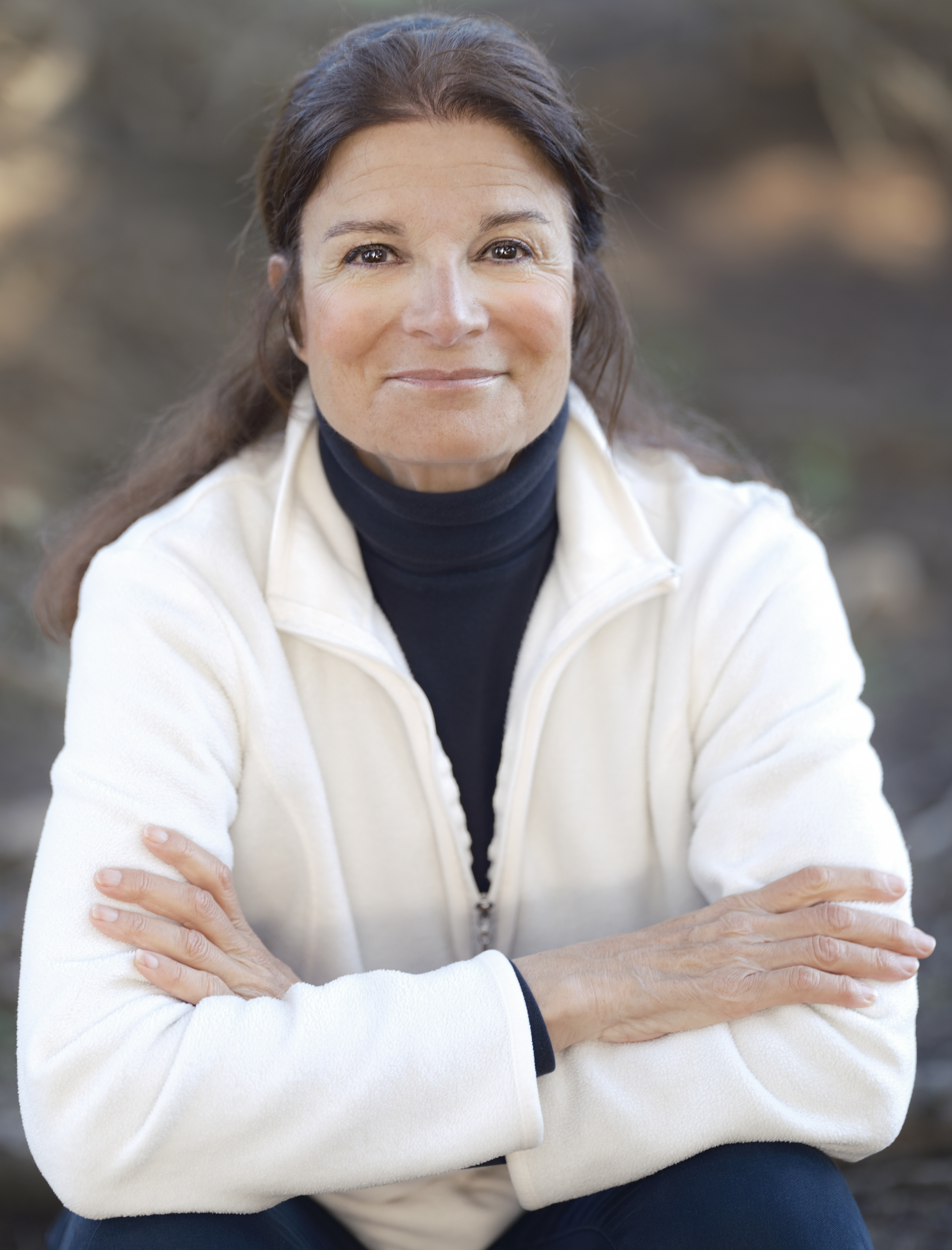
- Porco in 2021
- Born: March 6, 1953 (age 73); Bronx, New York, U.S.
- Education: California Institute of Technology; Stony Brook University
- Known for: Leader of Cassini Imaging Team; Discoveries about Saturn system; Member of Voyager Imaging Team; Expert in Planetary rings and Enceladus; The Day the Earth Smiled; Science communicator & public speaker; Film consultant.
- Awards: Porco asteroid; Lennart Nilsson Award (2009); AAS Carl Sagan Medal (2010); Caltech Distinguished Alumni Award (2011); Time 25 Most Influential People in Space (2012)
- Scientific career
- Fields: Planetary science Imaging science
- Workplaces: Cassini Imaging Central Laboratory for Operations, University of Colorado at Boulder
- Doctoral advisor: Peter Goldreich

Carolyn C. Porco (born March 6, 1953) is an American planetary scientist who explores the outer Solar System, beginning with her imaging work on the Voyager missions to Jupiter, Saturn, Uranus and Neptune in the 1980s. She led the imaging science team on the Cassini mission in orbit around Saturn. She is an expert on planetary rings and the Saturnian moon, Enceladus.

She has co-authored more than 110 scientific papers on subjects ranging from the spectroscopy of Uranus and Neptune, the interstellar medium, the photometry of planetary rings, satellite/ring interactions, computer simulations of planetary rings, the thermal balance of Triton's polar caps, heat flow in the interior of Jupiter, and a suite of results on the atmosphere, satellites, and rings of Saturn from the Cassini imaging experiment. In 2013, Cassini data confirmed a 1993 prediction by Porco and Mark Marley that acoustic oscillations within the body of Saturn are responsible for creating particular features in the rings of Saturn.

Porco was founder of The Day the Earth Smiled. She was also responsible for the epitaph and proposal to honor the renowned planetary geologist Eugene Shoemaker by sending his cremains to the Moon aboard the Lunar Prospector spacecraft in 1998.

A frequent public speaker, Porco has given two popular lectures at TED as well as the opening speech for Pangea Day, a May 2008 global broadcast coordinated from six cities around the world, in which she described the cosmic context for human existence. Porco has also won a number of awards and honors for her contributions to science and the public sphere; for instance, in 2009, New Statesman named her as one of 'The 50 People Who Matter Today.'

In 2010, Porco was awarded the Carl Sagan Medal, presented by the American Astronomical Society for Excellence in the Communication of Science to the Public. In 2012, she was named one of the 25 most influential people in space by Time magazine.

== Early life and education ==
Porco was born in New York City. She graduated in 1970 from Cardinal Spellman High School in the Bronx, New York City.

She earned a B.S. degree in Earth and Space Sciences from Stony Brook University in 1974. She received her Ph.D. degree in Planetary Sciences in 1983 from the California Institute of Technology in the Division of Geological and Planetary Sciences. Supervised by dynamicist Peter Goldreich, she wrote her doctoral dissertation focused on Voyager discoveries in the rings of Saturn.

== Career ==
=== Voyager ===
In the fall of 1983, Porco joined the faculty of the Department of Planetary Sciences at the University of Arizona; the same year she was made a member of the Voyager Imaging Team. In the latter capacity, she was an active participant in the Voyager 2 encounters with Uranus in 1986 and Neptune in 1989, leading the Rings Working Group within the Voyager Imaging Team during the Neptune encounter.

Porco was the first person to describe the behavior of the eccentric ringlets and the "spokes" discovered by Voyager within the rings of Saturn; to elucidate the mechanism by which the outer Uranian rings were being shepherded by the Voyager-discovered moons Cordelia and Ophelia; and to provide an explanation for the shepherding of the rings arcs of Neptune by the moon Galatea, also discovered by Voyager. She was a co-originator of the idea to take a 'portrait of the planets' with the Voyager 1 spacecraft, and participated in the planning, design, and execution of those images in 1990, including the famous Pale Blue Dot image of Earth.

=== Cassini–Huygens ===
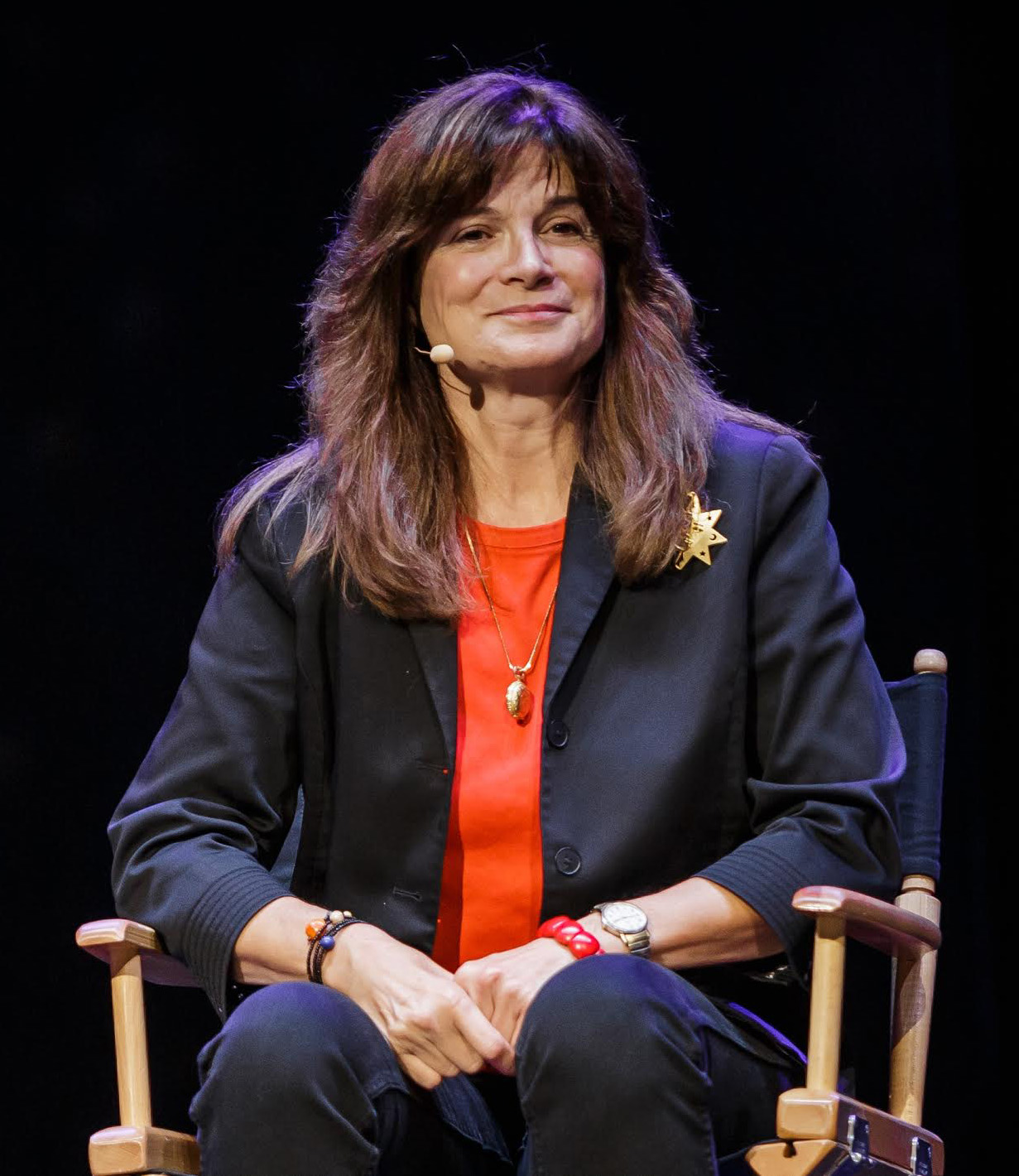
Porco at Star Talk Live, 2016.

In November 1990, Porco was selected as the leader of the Imaging Team for the Cassini-Huygens mission, an international mission that successfully placed a spacecraft in orbit around Saturn and deployed the atmospheric Huygens probe to Saturn's largest satellite, Titan. She is also the Director of the Cassini Imaging Central Laboratory for Operations (CICLOPS), which was the center of uplink and downlink operations for the Cassini imaging science experiment and the place where Cassini images are processed for release to the public. CICLOPS is part of the Space Science Institute in Boulder, Colorado.

In the course of the ongoing mission, Porco and her team have discovered seven moons of Saturn: Methone and Pallene, Polydeuces, Daphnis, Anthe, Aegaeon, and a small moonlet in the outer B ring. They also found several new rings, such as rings coincident with the orbits of Atlas, Janus and Epimetheus (the Saturnian 'co-orbitals') and Pallene; a diffuse ring between Atlas and the F ring; and new rings within several of the gaps in Saturn's rings.

In 2013, Cassini data confirmed a 1993 prediction by Porco and Mark Marley that acoustic oscillations within the body of Saturn are responsible for creating particular features in the rings of Saturn. This confirmation, the first to demonstrate that planetary rings can act like a seismograph in recording oscillatory motions within the host planet, should provide new constraints on the interior structure of Saturn. Such oscillations are known to exist in the sun as well as other stars.

Porco's team was responsible for the first sighting of a hydrocarbon lake, as well as a lake district, in the south polar region of Titan in June 2005. (A group of similar – and larger – features were sighted in the north polar region in February 2007.) The possibility that these sea-sized features are either completely or partially filled with liquid hydrocarbons is significantly strengthened by subsequent observations by other Cassini instruments.

Her team was also responsible for the first sighting of plumes erupting from Enceladus, Saturn's sixth largest moon. They first suggested, and provided detailed scientific arguments, that these jets might be geysers erupting from reservoirs of near-surface liquid water under the south pole of the small moon.

=== New Horizons ===
Porco was a member of the imaging team for the New Horizons mission to Pluto and the Kuiper Belt through 2014. The probe made its Pluto flyby in 2015.

=== The Day the Earth Smiled ===
As the Cassini imaging team lead, Porco initiated and planned the capture of a picture of Saturn with the Earth in the distance on July 19, 2013, an image along the lines of the famous Pale Blue Dot photo. The taking of the image was part of a larger concept entitled The Day The Earth Smiled, in which people the world over were invited to celebrate humanity's place in the cosmos and life on Earth by smiling the moment the picture was taken.

=== University positions ===
Porco served in the faculty of the University of Arizona from 1983 to 2001, achieving tenured professorship in 1991. She taught both graduates and undergraduates and was one of five finalists for the University of Arizona Honors Center Five Star Faculty Award, a campus-wide student-nominated, student-judged award for outstanding undergraduate teaching.

Porco is a senior research scientist at the Space Science Institute in Boulder, Colorado, and she is an adjunct professor at the University of Colorado at Boulder.

=== NASA advisor ===
Porco has been an active participant in guiding the American planetary exploration program through membership on many important NASA advisory committees, including the Solar System Exploration Subcommittee, the Mars Observer Recovery Study Team, and the Solar System Road Map Development Team. In the mid-1990s, she served as the chairperson for a small NASA advisory working group to study and develop future outer Solar System missions and she served as the Vice Chairperson of the Steering Group for the first Solar System Decadal Survey, sponsored by NASA and the National Academy of Sciences.

=== Public speaking ===
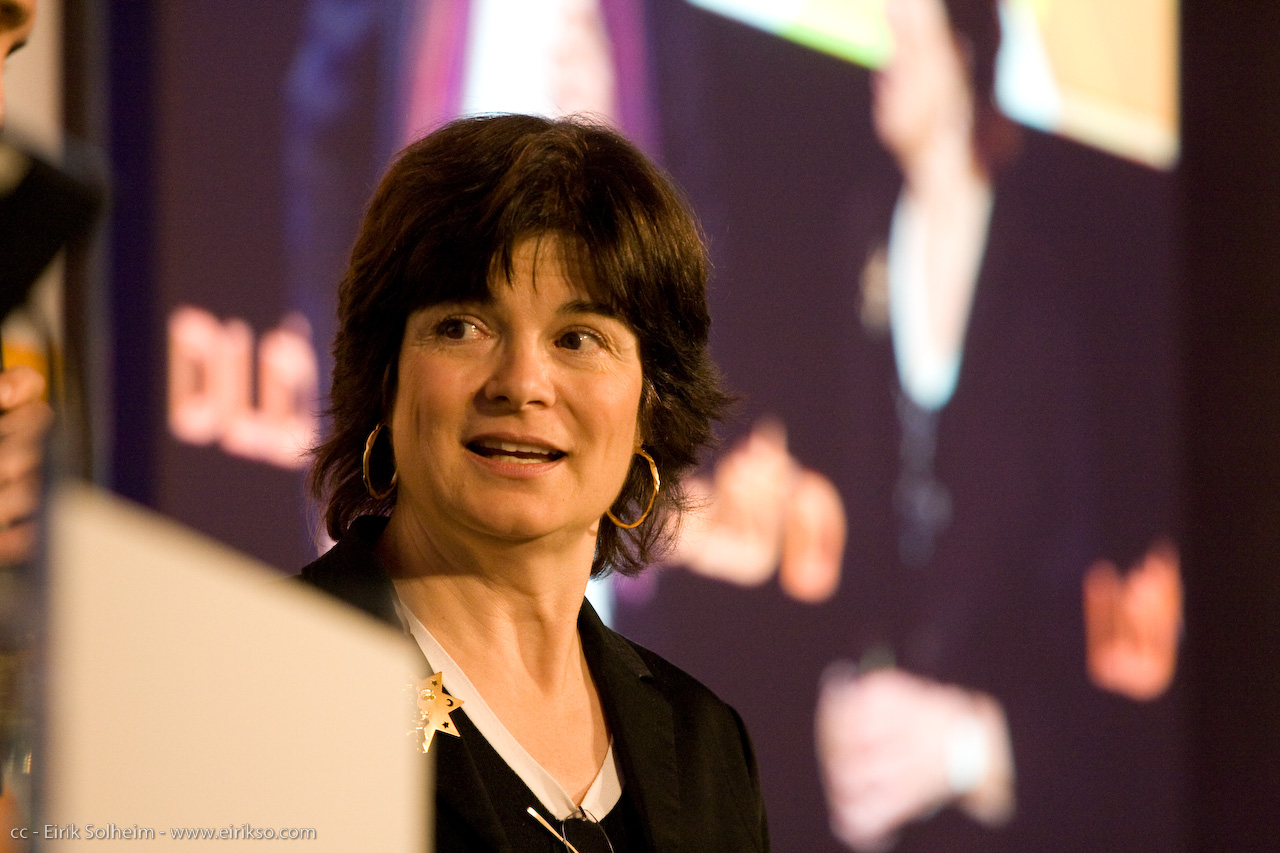
Porco in 2008.

Porco speaks frequently on the Cassini mission and planetary exploration in general, and has appeared at renowned conferences such as PopTech 2005 and TED (2007, 2009). She attended and was a speaker at the Beyond Belief symposium in November 2006.

Porco's 2007 TED talk, "The Human Journey," detailed two major areas of discovery made by the Cassini mission: the exploration of the Saturnian moons Titan and Enceladus. In her introductory remarks, Porco explained:

So the journey back to Saturn is really part of, and is also a metaphor for, a much larger human voyage.

In describing the environment of Titan, with its molecular nitrogen atmosphere suffused with organic compounds, Porco invited her audience to imagine the scene on the moon's surface:

Stop and think for a minute. Try to imagine what the surface of Titan might look like. It's dark: high noon on Titan is as dark as deep Earth twilight on the Earth. It's cold, it's eerie, it's misty, it might be raining, and you are standing on the shores of Lake Michigan brimming with paint thinner. That is the view that we had of the surface of Titan before we got there with Cassini. And I can tell you that what we have found on Titan, though not the same in detail, is every bit as fascinating as that story is, and for us, for Cassini people, it has been like a Jules Verne adventure come true.

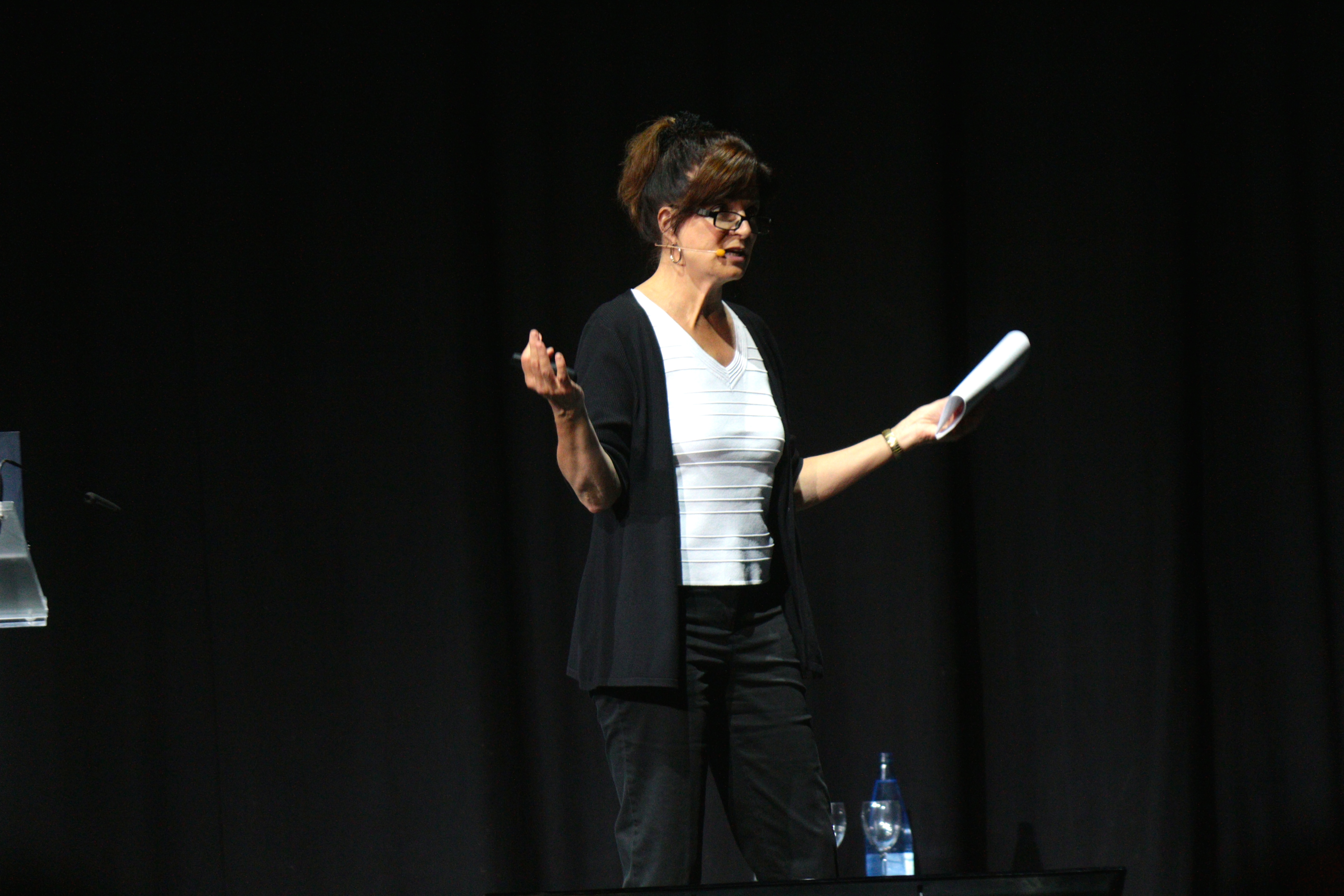
Porco speaking at the 2016 Starmus Festival.

After describing various features discovered on Titan by Cassini, and presenting the historic first photograph of Titan's surface by the Huygens lander, Porco went on to describe Enceladus and the jets of "fine icy particles" which erupt from the moon's southern pole:

...we have arrived at the conclusion that these jets may, they may, be erupting from pockets of liquid water near, under the surface of Enceladus. So we have, possibly, liquid water, organic materials and excess heat. In other words we have possibly stumbled upon the holy grail of modern-day planetary exploration, or in other words an environment that is potentially suitable for living organisms. And I don't think I need to tell you that the discovery of life elsewhere in our Solar system, whether it be on Enceladus or elsewhere, would have enormous cultural and scientific implications. Because if we could demonstrate that genesis had occurred – not once but twice, independently, in our Solar system – then that means by inference it has occurred a staggering number of times throughout our Universe in its 13.7 billion year history.

Porco's 2009 TED Talk was "Could a Saturn moon harbor life?".

She was a speaker at the 2016 Reason Rally.

=== Television and film ===
Porco has been a regular CNN guest analyst and consultant on astronomy, has made many radio and television appearances explaining science to the lay audience, including appearances on the MacNeil/Lehrer Newshour, CBS's 60 Minutes, Peter Jennings's The Century, and TV documentaries on planetary exploration such as The Planets on the Discovery Channel and the BBC, A Traveler's Guide to the Planets on the National Geographic Channel, Horizon on the BBC, and a Nova Cassini special on PBS. For the 2003 A&E special on the Voyager mission entitled Cosmic Journey: The Voyager Interstellar Mission and Message, Porco appeared onscreen and also served as the show's science advisor and animation director.

Porco served as an adviser for the 1997 film Contact, which was based on the 1987 novel of the same name by the well-known astronomer Carl Sagan. The actress Jodie Foster portrayed the heroine in the movie, and Sagan reportedly suggested that she use Porco as a real-life model to guide her performance.

Porco was also an adviser on the 2009 film Star Trek. The scene in which the Enterprise comes out of warp drive into the atmosphere of Titan, and rises submarine-style out of the haze, with Saturn and the rings in the background, was Porco's suggestion.

Porco was a guest on the BBC's Stargazing Live Series 4 in January 2014. She also appeared in The Farthest, a 2017 documentary on the Voyager program.

=== Interviews and articles ===
Porco has given numerous interviews in print media on subjects ranging from planetary exploration to the conflict between science and religion (for example, Newsweek and the journal The Humanist).

She has been profiled many times in print, beginning in the Boston Globe (October 1989), The New York Times (August 1999, September 2009), the Tucson Citizen (2001), Newsday (June 2004), for the Royal Astronomical Society of Canada (2006), in Astronomy Now (2006), in Discover Magazine (2007), and also online on CNN.com (2005) and Edge.org.

Prior to Cassini's launch, she was a strong and visible defendant of the usage of radioactive materials on the Cassini spacecraft. She is a supporter of a plan for human spaceflight toward the Moon and Mars, and in an op-ed piece published in The New York Times, she highlighted the benefits of a deep-space-capable heavy launch vehicle for the robotic exploration of the Solar System. Porco has advocated for prioritizing the exploration of Enceladus over Europa.

=== Other ===
Popular science articles by Porco have been published in The Sunday Times, Astronomy, the Arizona Daily Star, Sky & Telescope, American Scientist, and Scientific American. She is active in the presentation of science to the public as the leader of the Cassini Imaging Team, as the creator/editor of the website where Cassini images are posted. She writes the site's homepage "Captain's Log" greeting to the public. She is an atheist.

== Awards and honors ==
In 1999, Porco was selected by The Sunday Times (London) as one of 18 scientific leaders of the 21st century, and by Industry Week as one of 50 Stars to Watch. In 2008 she was chosen to be on Wired magazine's inaugural 'Smart List: 15 People the Next President Should Listen To.'

Her contributions to the exploration of the outer Solar System were recognized with the naming of Asteroid (7231) Porco which is "Named in honor of Carolyn C. Porco, a pioneer in the study of planetary ring systems...and a leader in spacecraft exploration of the outer solar system."

In 2008, Porco was awarded the Isaac Asimov Science Award by the American Humanist Association.

In May 2009, Porco received an Honorary D.Sc. degree from Stony Brook University, of which she is an alumna.

In September 2009, Porco was awarded The Huntington Library's Science Writer Fellowship for 2010. That same month, New Statesman named her as one of 'The 50 People Who Matter Today.'

In October 2009, she and Babak Amin Tafreshi were each awarded the 2009 Lennart Nilsson Award in recognition of their photographic work. The award panel's citation for Porco reads as follows:

Carolyn Porco combines the finest techniques of planetary exploration and scientific research with aesthetic finesse and educational talent. While her images, which depict the heavenly bodies of the Saturn system with unique precision, serve as tools for the world's leading experts, they also reveal the beauty of the universe in a manner that is an inspiration to one and all.

In October 2010, Porco was awarded the 2010 Carl Sagan Medal for Excellence in the Communication of Science to the Public, presented by the American Astronomical Society's Division for Planetary Sciences.

In 2011 she won the Distinguished Alumni Award from the California Institute of Technology, the highest honor regularly bestowed by Caltech.

In 2012, Porco was named one of the 25 most influential people in space by Time magazine.

Porco received the Sikkens Prize for her "exceptional contribution to a realistic and colourful image of the universe" in 2020, which was presented on October 2, 2022.

== Musical interests ==
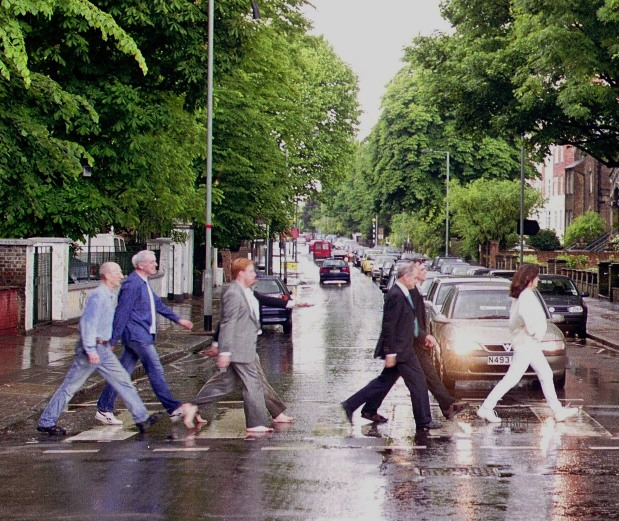
Porco (at right) re-enacting the famous Beatles photograph at Abbey Road with the other members of the Cassini Imaging Team.

Porco is fascinated by the 1960s and The Beatles and has, at times, incorporated references to The Beatles and their music into her presentations, writings, and press releases. She visited 20 Forthlin Road, Liverpool, Paul McCartney's teenage home, after it opened as a Beatles Museum in 1995. The first color image released by Cassini to the public was an image of Jupiter, taken during Cassini's approach to the giant planet and released on October 9, 2000, to honor John Lennon's 60th birthday. In 2006, she produced and directed a brief 8-minute movie of 64 of Cassini's most spectacular images, put to the music of the Beatles, in honor of Paul McCartney's 64th birthday. And in 2007, she produced a poster showing 64 scenes from Saturn.

Porco is also interested in dance and fascinated with Michael Jackson. In August 2010, she won a Michael Jackson costume/dance contest held in Boulder, Colorado.

Quotes of Porco's were used in the production of "The Poetry of Reality (An Anthem for Science)", "A Wave of Reason", "Children of Africa (The Story of Us)", and "Onward to the Edge!" by Symphony of Science.

== See also ==
- List of women in leadership positions on astronomical instrumentation projects
