= Hello, World (photograph) =

Photograph of Earth by Reid Wiseman

Hello, World, taken by Reid Wiseman of the Artemis II crew on April 2, 2026

Hello, World is a photograph of Earth taken by NASA astronaut Reid Wiseman aboard the Orion spacecraft on April 2, 2026, during the Artemis II mission, and published on April 3. The photo shows Earth as a disk, but not a complete hemisphere. It was captured during the first leg of the spacecraft's outbound journey toward the Moon. It and a preceding lower-exposure snapshot by Wiseman are the first photographs of a full Earth disk taken by a human since 1972, when The Blue Marble was taken by the Apollo 17 crew.

The photograph shows the night-side of the Earth. Although the Earth is still illuminated by the full moon, it is quite dark compared to a Sun-lit Earth. Thus, Wiseman photographed it with a longer exposure.

== Image ==
Animation of images taken by Wiseman which includes Hello, World. Closeups are shown of aurorae, satellite flares, lightning, urban lights, afterglow and airglow.

The image shows Earth at night illuminated by moonlight from a full Moon. Africa dominates the left of the frame, with the Sahara largely unobscured by cloud cover and parts of Europe visible to the north; the Iberian Peninsula appears at the lower left. The Atlantic Ocean is visible, with South America to the right. City lights are visible across the night side, while a bright lens flare near the center is caused by window reflection. The image is rotated about 146° from a standard north-up orientation, and the outlines of Integrity's windows are visible as dark cutouts along the edges of the frame. Along Earth's limb, the upper atmosphere appears as a thin band of airglow. Auroras are visible near both poles. Sunlight refracted along the horizon produces a faint afterglow and is reflected in space by interplanetary medium as the zodiacal light.

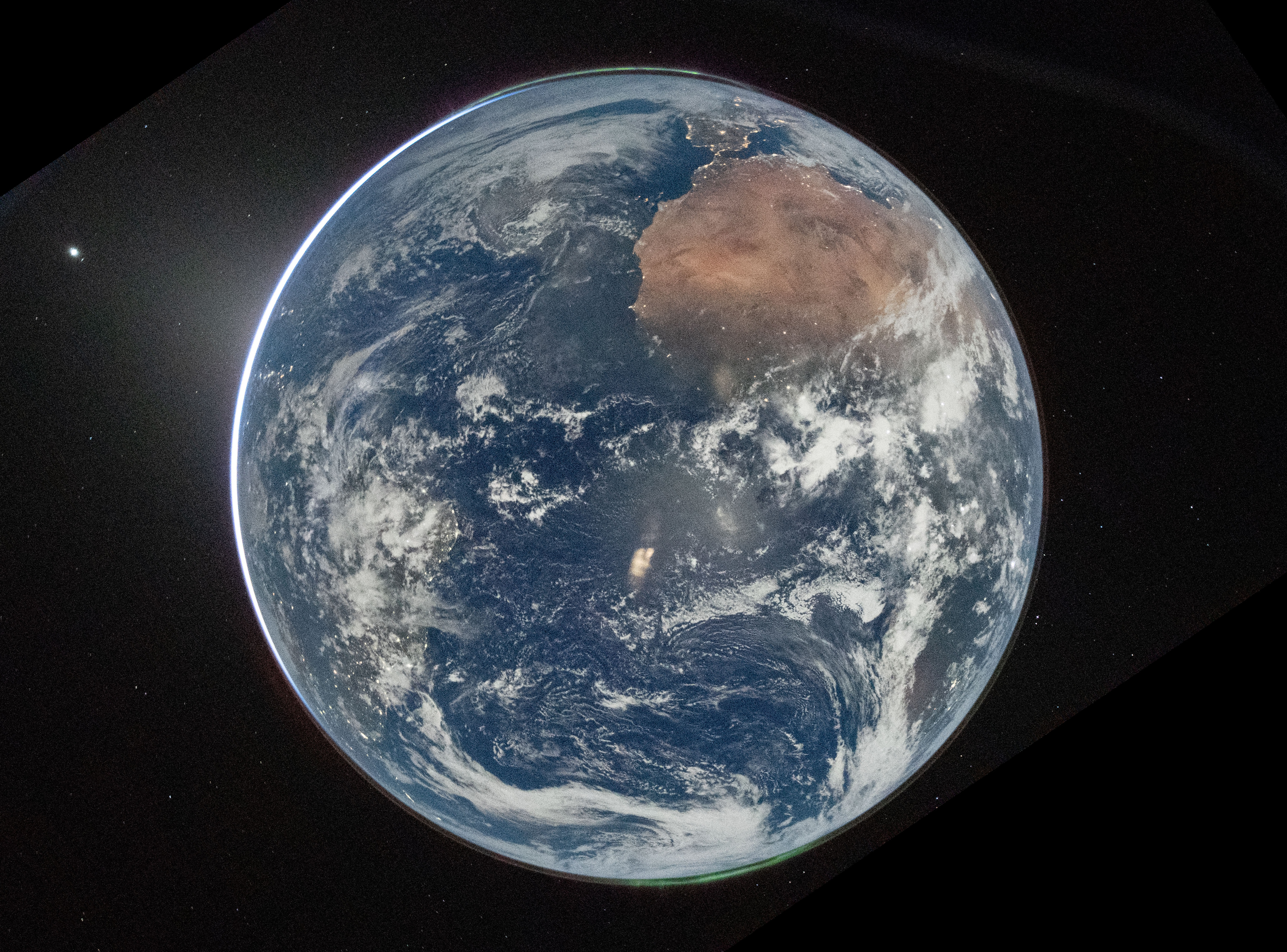
The image rotated 146°, making it look more familiar to viewers

The sodium layer is visible around the disk with its characteristic layer of yellow airglow. Additionally lightning on Earth and flares of satellites in orbit are discernible, particularly through the timelapse of the series of similar photos.

Earth's approximate orientation in Hello, World, Africa on the left, South America on the right

Venus appears as a bright point in the bottom-right section of the photo. The Sun, Saturn, Neptune, Mars and Mercury are all hidden behind the Earth. The constellation Cetus appears to the right of Earth, the brightest star being Tau Ceti. Pegasus is in the lower left and Aquarius in the upper left.

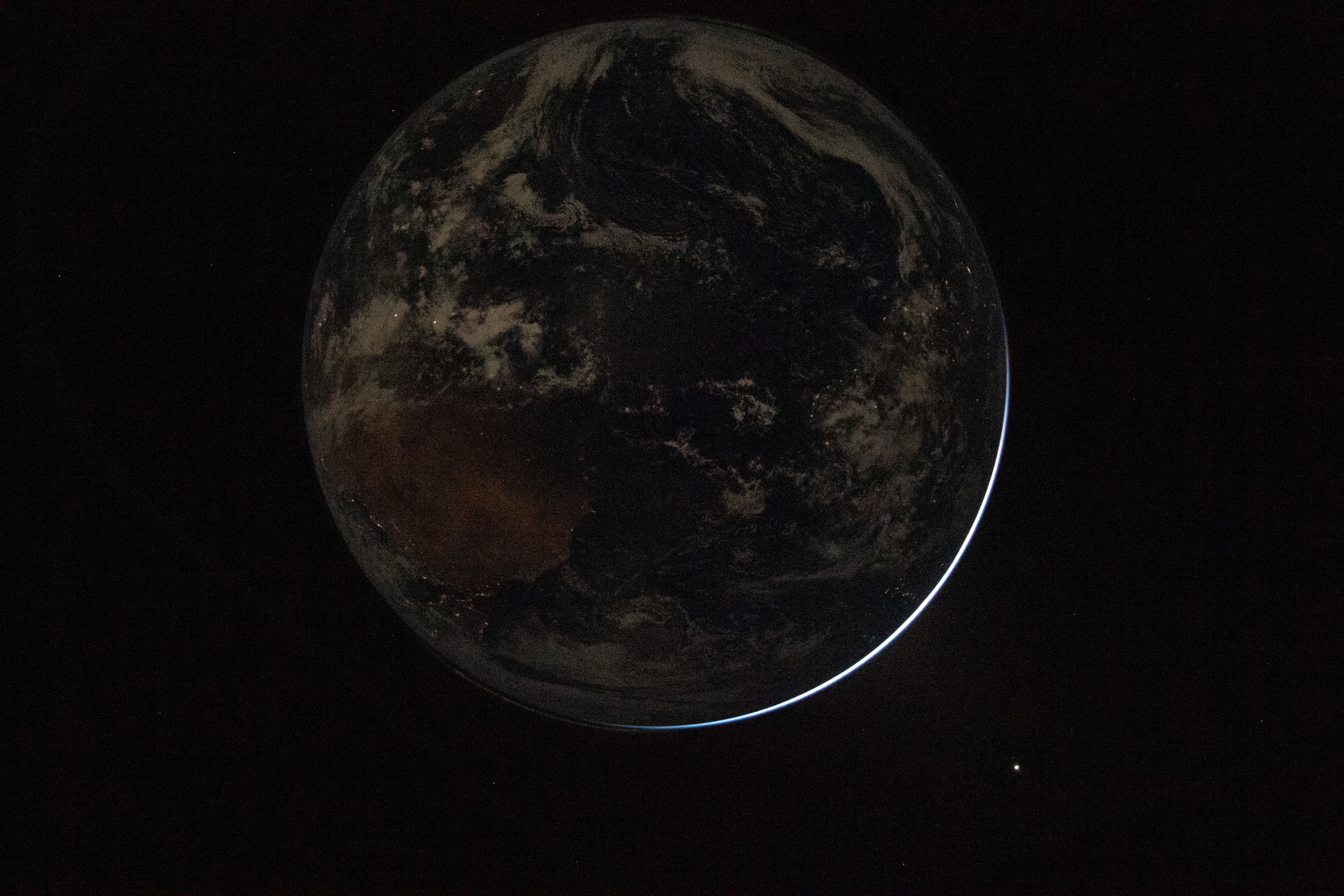
Previous photograph by Wiseman, taken with a lower exposure

The photograph was taken on April 3, 2026, (Note: The EXIF date and time information is April 3, 2026, 00:27:39 UTC.) about a day after launch and shortly after completion of the trans-lunar injection burn that placed Orion on a free-return trajectory toward the Moon. Wiseman captured the image through a spacecraft window using a Nikon D5 camera with a long exposure (f/4, ISO 51,200, 1/4-second shutter speed). The Orion spacecraft was around 9,889 km (6,145 mi) from Earth's surface. (Note: The image metadata indicates that it was taken using a Nikon D5 camera with a 14–24 mm f/2.8 lens at an aperture of f/4, an exposure time of 1/4 second, and an ISO setting of 51,200; the exposure was set manually and the image was later processed using Adobe Photoshop Lightroom Classic.) NASA also released a lower-exposure "night" version of the image, taken shortly beforehand by Wiseman, which emphasizes city lights and reduces reflected glare.

The title "Hello, World" alludes to the crew's greeting and to the traditional test message used in computer programming.

== See also ==
- First images of Earth from space
- List of notable images of Earth from space
- List of photographs considered the most important
- Earthset, another photograph from the Artemis II mission, taken by Christina Koch on April 6, 2026
- Earthrise, photograph by William Anders from the 1968 Apollo 8 mission
