= Family Portrait (Voyager) =

1990 Solar System image by Voyager 1

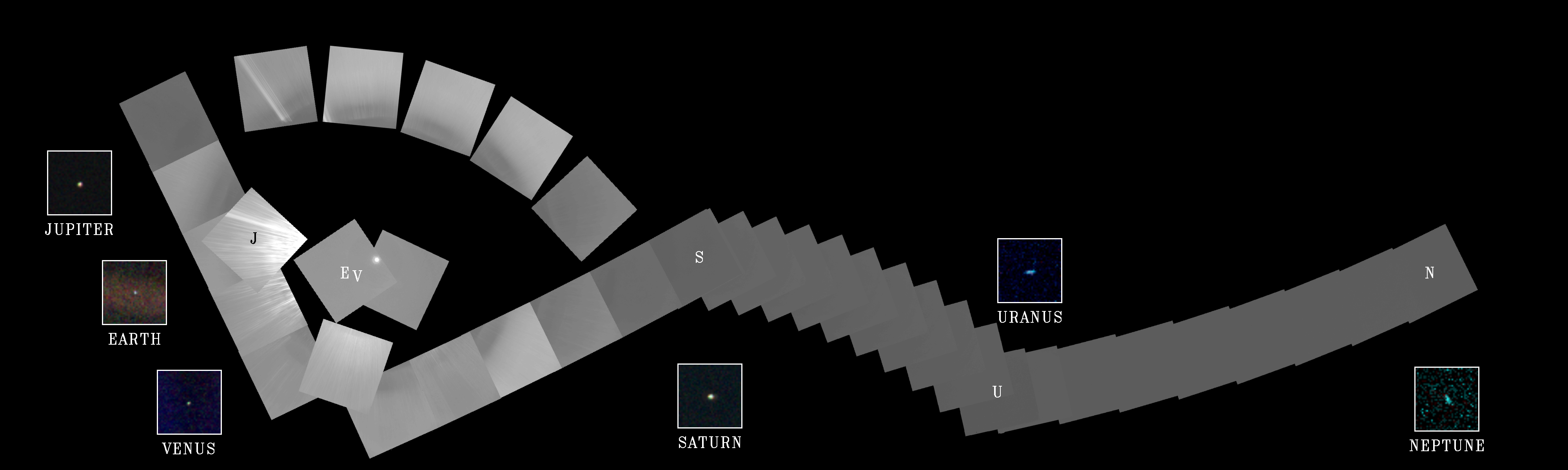
The Family Portrait of the Solar System taken by Voyager 1

The Family Portrait, or sometimes Portrait of the Planets, is an image of the Solar System acquired by Voyager 1 on February 14, 1990, from a distance of approximately 6 billion km (40 AU; 3.7 billion mi) from Earth. It features individual frames of six planets and a partial background indicating their relative positions. The picture is a mosaic of 60 frames. The frames used to compose the image were the last photographs taken by either Voyager spacecraft (which continued to relay other telemetry afterward). The frames were also the source of the famous Pale Blue Dot image of the Earth. Astronomer Carl Sagan, who was part of the Voyager imaging team, campaigned for many years to have the pictures taken.

== Description ==
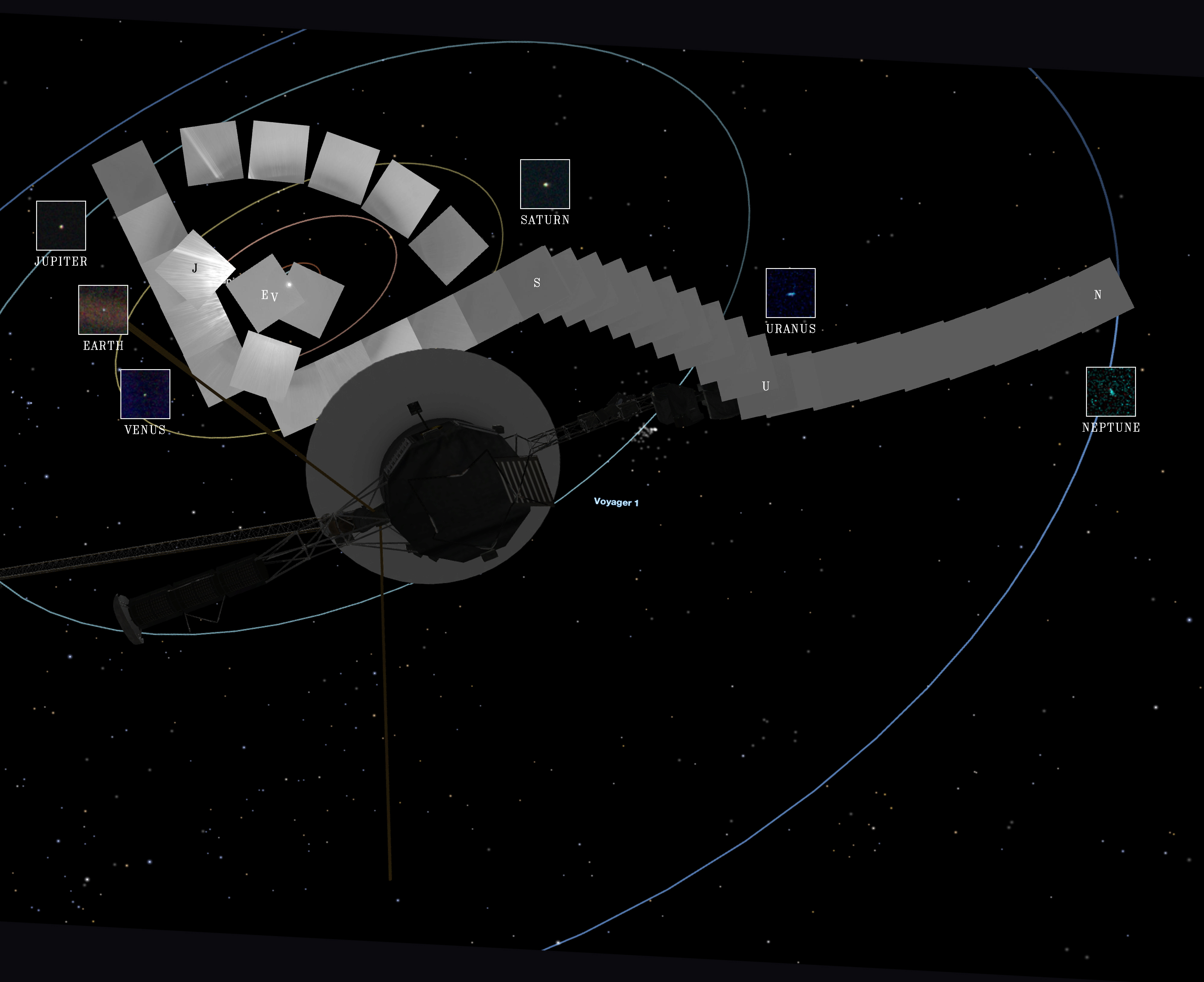
Diagram of the Family Portrait showing the planets' orbits and the relative position of Voyager 1 when the mosaic was captured.

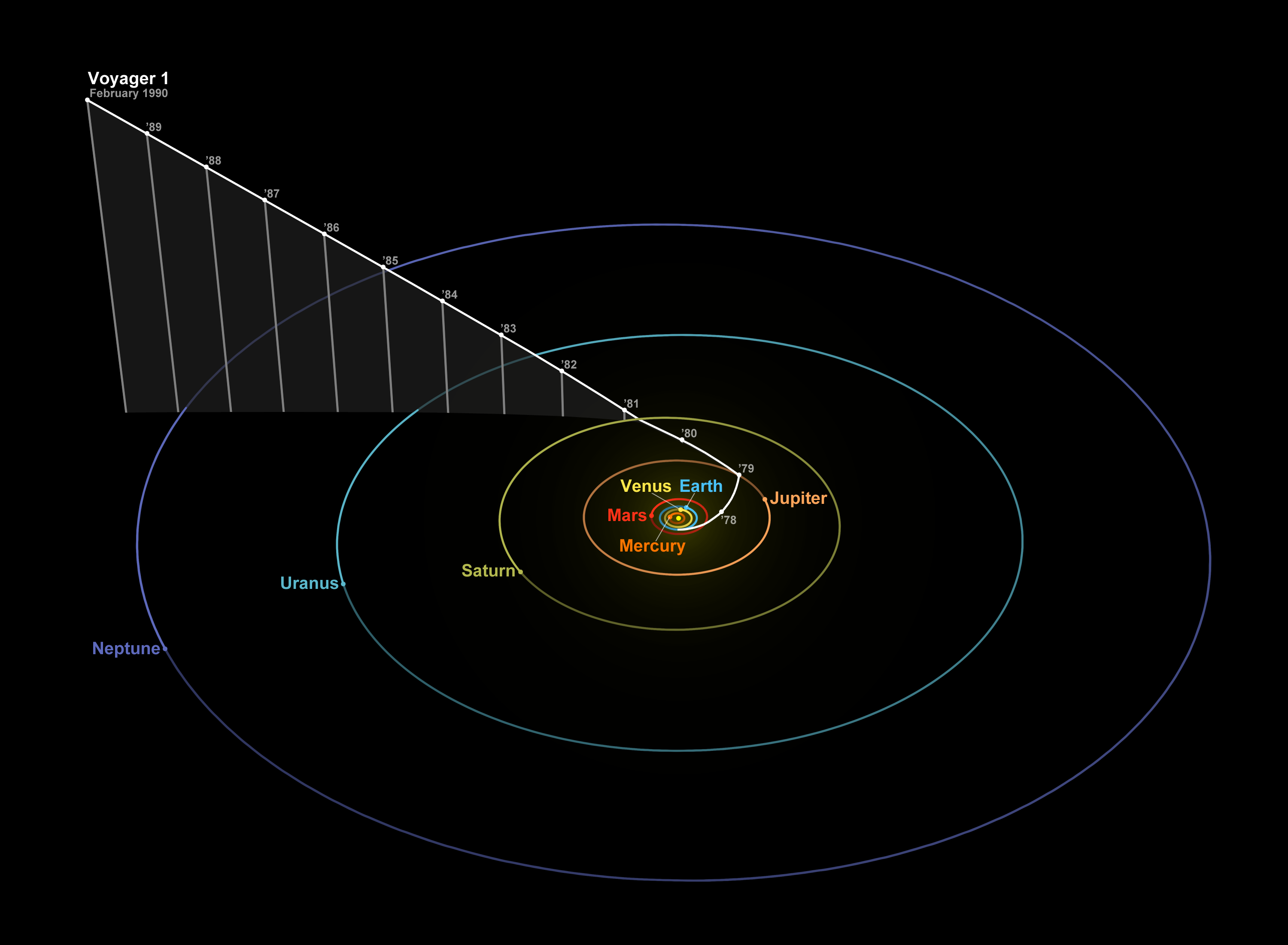
Position of Voyager 1 above the plane of the ecliptic on February 14, 1990

Six planets are visible in the mosaic, from left to right: Jupiter, Earth, Venus, Saturn, Uranus, and Neptune. The Sun, also a point of light at this distance, is included in the image. Three (then) planets were missed. Mercury was too close to the Sun to be seen. Mars could not be detected by the Voyager cameras due to its position resulting in it only producing a thin crescent from the viewpoint of the spacecraft, and Pluto (which, in 1990, was still considered a planet) was not included because its small size and distance from the Sun left it too dim to image. Mars could have been imaged through a clear filter rather than the colored ones used, but by the time this was evident, the process was too far advanced to make the changes.

The image does not have a unified appearance. The individual frames were acquired using various filters at varying exposures to bring out as much detail as possible in each. For example, the Sun was imaged with the darkest filter and shortest exposure available, to avoid damaging the Imaging Science System vidicon tubes. The majority of the frames were acquired in gray scale with the probe's Wide-Angle Camera, while the close-up views of each planet were acquired in color using the Narrow-Angle Camera.

The image was acquired at a distance of approximately 40.11 AU (6.0 billion km; 3.7 billion mi) from Earth and approximately 32° above the ecliptic plane. Between the two Voyager spacecraft, Voyager 1 was chosen to create the mosaic because its trajectory had taken it above the plane of the Solar System. Also, Voyager 1 was in a position to view Jupiter free of light disturbances by the Sun's glare, as Jupiter was on the opposite side of the Sun from Voyager 2. In 2013, a reverse image was taken of Voyager 1, using radio telescopes. Voyager 1 cannot be seen in visible light, but its radio signal is very bright compared to most natural objects studied by radio telescopes.

== See also ==
- Family Portrait (MESSENGER)
- List of photographs considered the most important
- Pale Blue Dot
