= Earthset =

Photograph of Earth from the Artemis II mission

Earthset, by Christina Koch aboard the Integrity capsule of Artemis II, 2026

Earthset is a photograph of Earth taken by American astronaut Christina Koch on April 6, 2026 at 22:41 UTC from the Integrity capsule during the Artemis II crew's flyby of the Moon. It contrasts to Earthrise, a 1968 photograph taken by American astronaut William Anders during the Apollo 8 mission, in which Earth appears to rise above the Moon's horizon during lunar orbit. Koch captured the image using a Nikon D5 camera. (Note: The image metadata indicates that it was taken using a Nikon D5 camera with an 80–400 mm f/4.5-5.6 lens at a focal length of 400 mm, an aperture of f/8, an exposure time of 1/1000 second, and an ISO setting of 400; the image was later processed using Adobe Photoshop Lightroom Classic.)

== Details ==
Approximate orientation of Earth as photographed Night side of Earth Occluded by the Moon

The image shows Earth setting behind the cratered lunar surface, with the planet's night side in darkness, and sunlit cloud systems visible over the Australia and Oceania regions. In the foreground the Ohm crater on the far side of the Moon is visible, characterized by terraced edges and a relatively flat floor interrupted by central peaks, which form when the lunar surface, temporarily liquefied during impact, rebounds upward during crater formation. The photo was taken at 22:41 UTC (18:41 EDT) on April 6, 2026 during the lunar flyby of Artemis II, on a Nikon D5 camera by mission specialist Christina Koch, the first woman to travel near the Moon, through the window of the Orion spacecraft Integrity, and later processed in Adobe Photoshop Lightroom Classic.

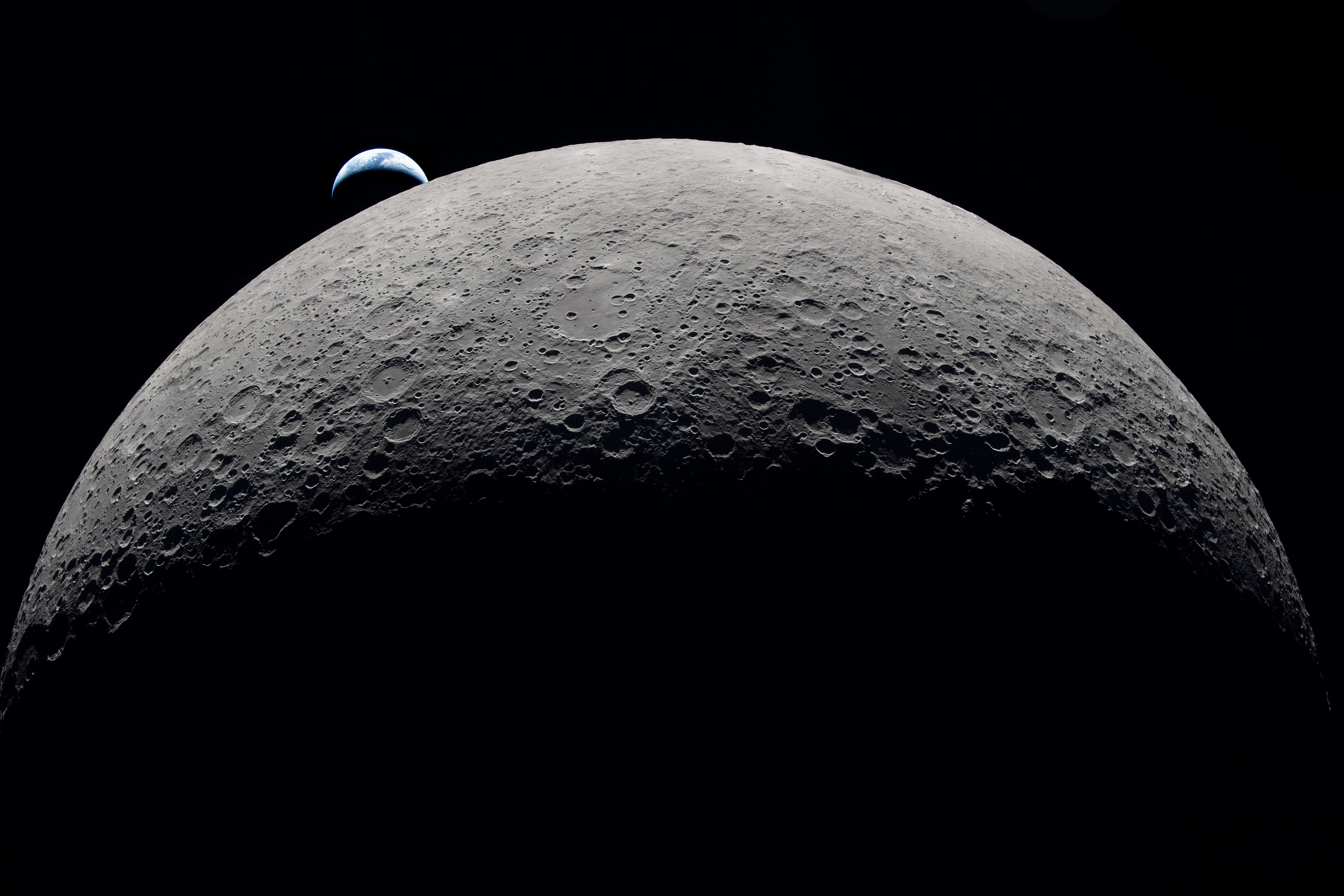
A wider-angle view. In this photograph, the lunar sunrise terminator is at 146° West. The many crater chains (catenae) lead to the location of Mare Orientale at the Moon's limb.

Only one chance in this lifetime, video by Reid Wiseman

Earthset is similar to Earthrise, taken in 1968 by William Anders on Apollo 8, the first spaceflight to orbit the Moon. Earthrise is considered one of the most famous photographs in history and is believed to have influenced the birth of the environmental movement. Unlike Earthrise, Earthset was planned in advance.

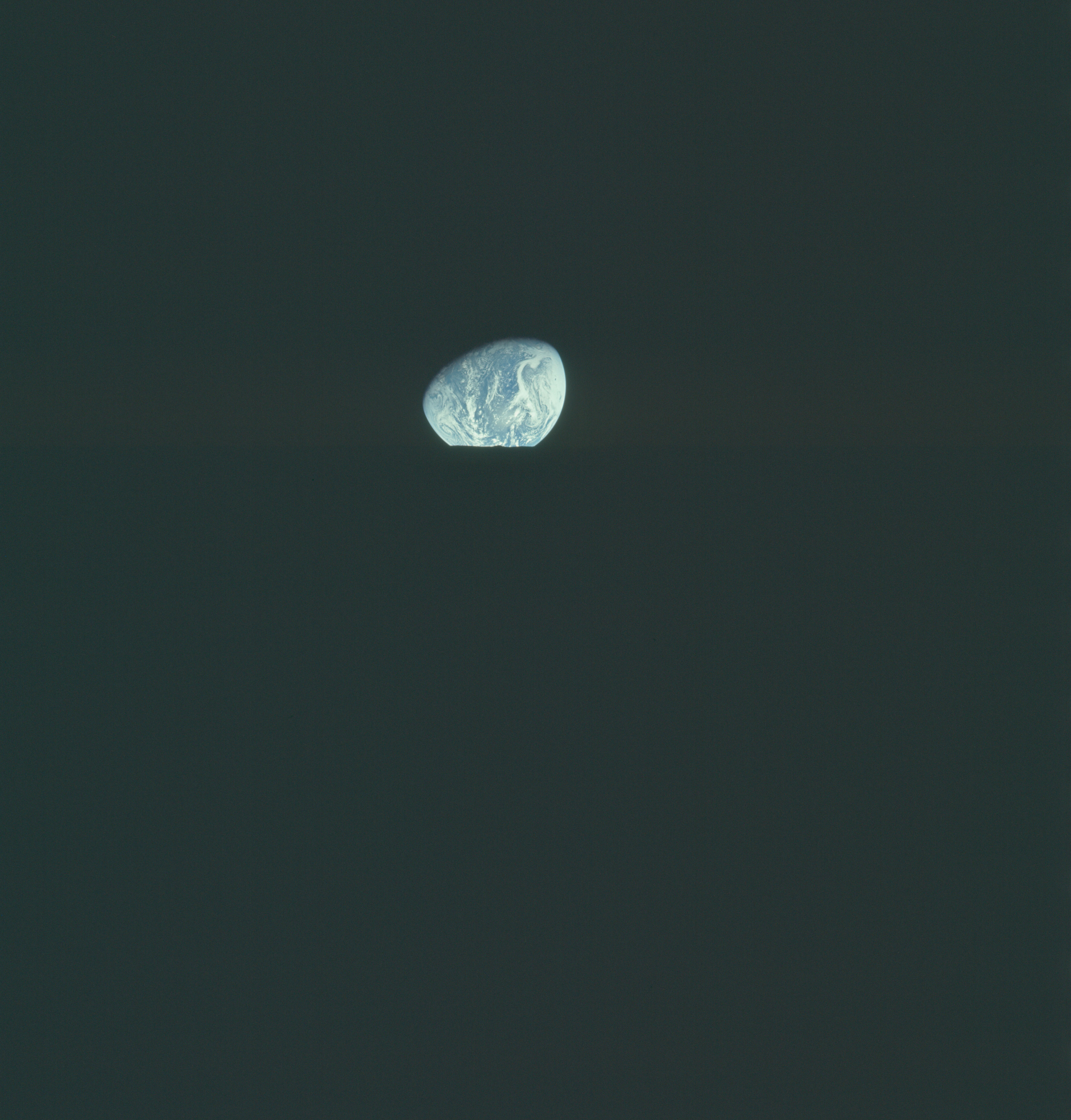
Photograph of an earthset from Apollo 17, 1972

A previous photograph of Earth appearing to set behind the lunar surface is seen in Harrison Schmitt's article "Exploring Taurus-Littrow" (Apollo 17), on page 307 in the September 1973 issue of National Geographic.

Historian Robert Poole considered the name Earthset ideal for an era when societies are threatened by climate change.

== Brownish hue of the lunar surface ==
The brownish coloration of the lunar surface, which is frequently seen in orbital photographs of the Moon with Earth's light bluish colored crescent in the background, is mentioned in the article "To the Mountains of the Moon" (Apollo 15) by Kenneth F. Weaver, in the February 1972 issue of National Geographic, pages 255–257. It is also seen in Carl Sagan's book Cosmos (1980), Chapter 4: '"Heaven and Hell", page 84: orbital lunar photograph AS12-47-6890 (Magazine V), made during the mission of Apollo 12 in November 1969, showing the region of the northwestern section of crater Pasteur, on the eastern part of the Moon's far side.

== See also ==
- First images of Earth from space
- List of notable images of Earth from space
- Hello, World, photograph by Reid Wiseman from the Artemis II mission, taken on April 3, 2026
- Astronaut photo
