= Family Portrait (MESSENGER) =

Photograph of the Solar System taken by MESSENGER spacecraft

The Solar System Family Portrait is an image of many of the Solar System's planets and moons acquired by MESSENGER during November 2010 from approximately the orbit of Mercury. The mosaic is intended to be complementary to Voyager 1's Family Portrait acquired from the outer edge of the Solar System on February 14, 1990.

The portrait was constructed using 34 individual frames acquired using the Mercury Dual Imaging System, targeting areas surrounding each planet. The first series of images was acquired on November 3, and the second on November 16, 2010.

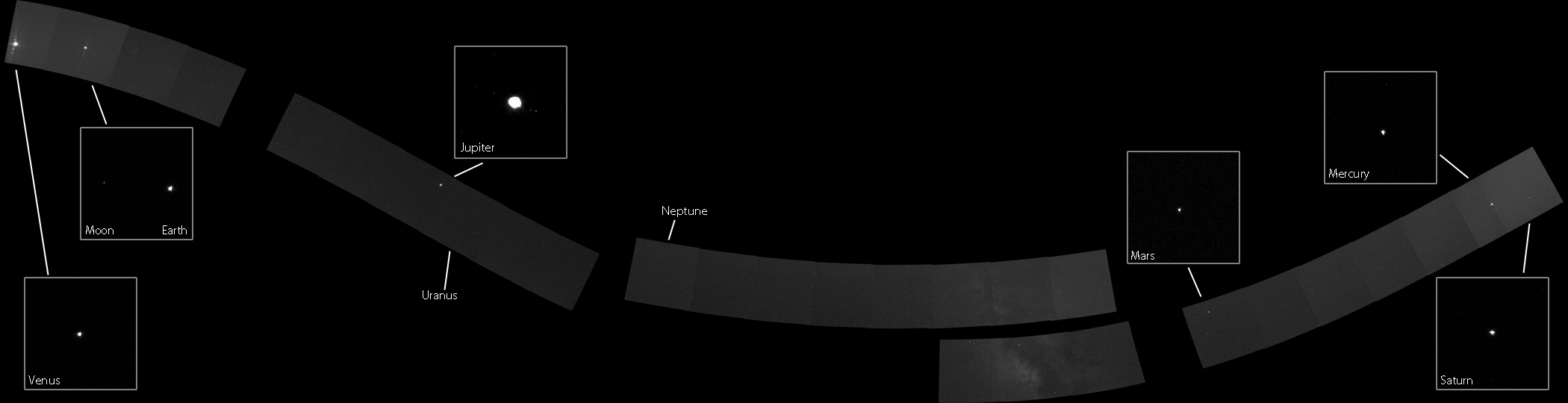
MESSENGER's Family Portrait

See full resolution image

Six planets are visible in the mosaic. From left to right: Venus, Earth, Jupiter, Mars, Mercury, and Saturn. Uranus and Neptune were too small to resolve at this distance (3.0-billion and 4.4-billion kilometers respectively). Careful effort was taken to avoid facing the camera toward the Solar System's central star, the Sun, due to the intense heat at close distance.

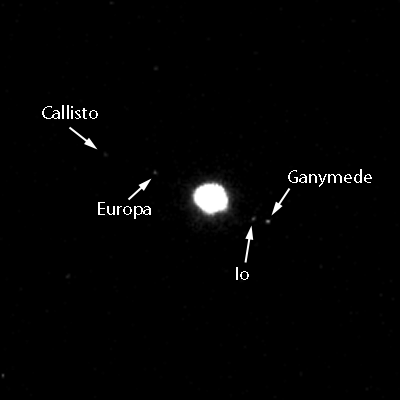
All four Galilean moons are visible in this Narrow-Angle Camera image.

Several moons are visible in the photo, including the Earth's Moon, and all four Galilean moons: Callisto, Ganymede, Europa, and Io. Additionally, part of the Milky Way is visible between Neptune and Mars.

Because MESSENGER does not follow the same orbital plane as the Earth, the cameras on the spacecraft had to point up and down from the ecliptic to capture all of the planets. This resulted in a curved mosaic.

Although somewhat closer to Earth, a similar so-called family portrait of the Earth, Venus and Mars was taken by the Solar Orbiter spacecraft on 18 November 2020.

== See also ==
- Family Portrait, taken by Voyager 1, February 14, 1990
