= 2003 Webby Awards =

US internet awards ceremony

The 7th Annual Webby Awards were held in San Francisco, California on June 5, 2003. Due to budget cutbacks made in response to the 2002 Internet bubble, the decision was made to hold this year's ceremony partially online. This would be the last year that the Webbys would be presented in California prior to their relocation in New York City. For this award ceremony, the business category was expanded with the addition of a new award for "Best Online Businesses." This award would be presented for "sites that excel at achieving fundamental business goals such as increasing sales lead generation or enhancing customer loyalty and retention, marketplace impact and innovation."

== Nominees and winners ==
(from)

Category	Webby Award Winner	People's Voice Winner	Other nominees
Activism	ActForChange	Greenpeace	The Jane Goodall Institute, Voice Yourself, World Resources Institute
Best Practices	Movable Type	Wired News	Commanding Heights Online, Edutopia Online, Theban Mapping Project
Broadband	CBC Radio 3	CBC Radio 3	BET Hollagram, Commanding Heights Online, Heavy, Homeless
Commerce	Amazon.com	Amazon.com	Art.com, Fresh Direct, RedEnvelope, The Tire Rack
Comedy	get your war on	The Onion	Eric Conveys an Emotion, oddtodd.com, White House
Community	Meetup	Geocaching	BBC Video Nation, LiveJournal, Nervous Industries
Education	NASA Earth Observatory	NASA Earth Observatory	BrainPOP, Plumb Design Visual Thesaurus, sodaplay, The New York Times Learning Network
Fashion, Style & Beauty	SHOWstudio	Style.com	Hint Fashion Magazine, JAPANESE STREETS, Lucire
Financial Services & Banking	PayPal	PayPal	ClearStation, E-LOAN, Quicken.com, Yahoo! Finance
Games	Orisinal	Swirve	A Tale in the Desert, Disney's Toontown Online, Indie Game Jam, PopCap Games
Government & Law	NASA	NASA	National Weather Service, Publius, Rete Civica Iperbole - Comune di Bologna, United Nations
Health & Wellness	teenwire.com	HIV STOPS WITH ME	Cancer.gov, lifeclinic.com, Planned Parenthood Golden Gate
Living	Do-It-Yourself Network	Do-It-Yourself Network	Bad Girl Swirl, Girl-on-the-street, Kitchens.com, oddtodd.com
Movie & Film	indieWire	Rotten Tomatoes	Bright Lights Film Journal, Metacritic, SPONGI
Music	The Flaming Lips	The Flaming Lips	Metacritic, Okayplayer.com, pinknoises.com, Tech.Nitions
NetArt	Listening Post	Penny Arcade	Andy Deck-Art Context, BlinkenLights, NYC Surveillance Camera Players
News	Google News	BBC News Online	allAfrica.com, MSNBC, Romenesko
Personal Blog/Website	NobodyHere	Cockeyed.com	David Still, Jeff Harris, Jenville
Politics	MoveOn.org	The Note	Congress.org, Environmental Working Group, IssuesPA
Print & Zines	AlterNet	The Onion	Boxes and Arrows, Metropolis Magazine, Shift Online
Radio	Epitonic Radio	CBC Radio 3	KEXP, This American Life, Transom, Youth Radio
Religion & Spirituality	Pluralism Project	Greek Orthodox Archdiocese of America	BBCi Religion & Ethics, Girardian Reflections on the Lectionary, Parish of Trinity Church, Ritualwell.org
Science	exploreMarsnow	HowStuffWorks	Eric Weisstein's World of Mathematics, SCIENCE HOBBYIST, Scirus
Services & Utilities	eBay	eBay	Evite, Netflix, Paytrust, VolunteerMatch
Sports	ESPN.com	ESPN.com	NBA.com, Surfline, The Official Site of The America's Cup, Tour de France - 2002
Television, Film & Streaming	Nick.com	CartoonNetwork.com	Animal Planet: Future is Wild Interactive, Frontline/World, HBO Online
Travel & Lifestyle	Lonely Planet Online	Lonely Planet Online	IgoUgo, Joe Sent Me, SeatGuru, The New York Times: Travel
Technical Achievement	Apache Web Server	Google	Laszlo Presentation Server, Linux, phpBB
Weird	rathergood.com	rathergood.com	20th Century Castles, David Hasselhoff Video: Hooked on a Feeling, FORTEAN TIMES ONLINE, Pole Shift Preparation
Youth	3d&i	Disney's Toontown Online	BAMboozled.org, sodaplay, Whyville
