= Quell =

Quell may refer to:

- Slang for the drug quetiapine (Seroquel)
- Quell (video game), an iOS and Android video game
- Quell (wearable), a wearable device that claims to offer relief from chronic pain
