= The Blue Marble =

Photograph of Earth taken by Apollo 17 crew

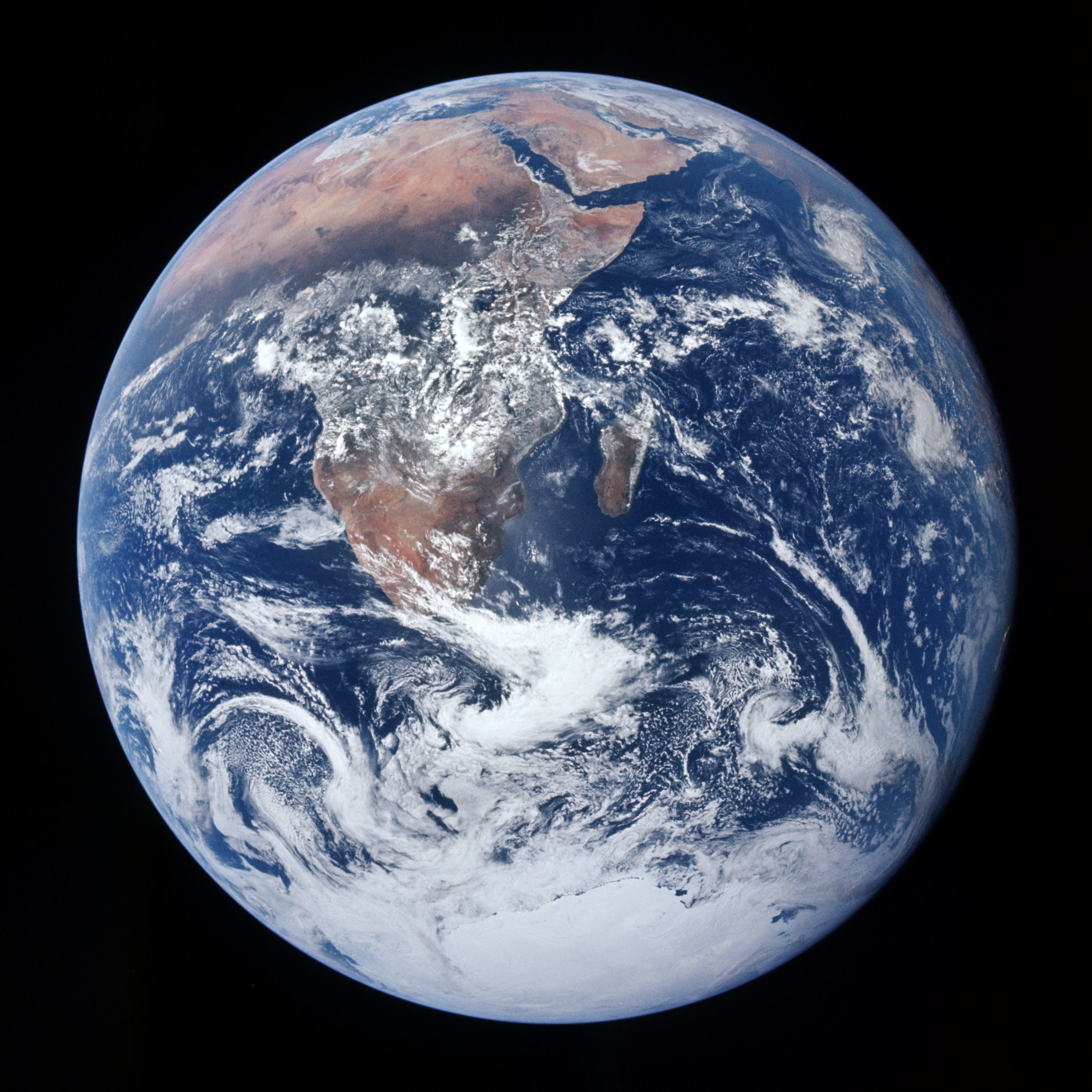
The Blue Marble, taken by the Apollo 17 crew in 1972. The original photograph was taken with the South Pole facing the top; however, cropped, rotated, and processed versions are the most commonly used, like this one.

The Blue Marble is a photograph of Earth taken on December 7, 1972, by one of the astronauts aboard the Apollo 17 spacecraft on its way to the Moon. Viewed from around 29,400 kilometers (18,300 mi; 15,900 nmi) from Earth's surface, a cropped, rotated, and processed version has become one of the most reproduced images in history.

In the original NASA image, named AS17-148-22727 and centered at about 26°19′49″S 37°25′13″E with the South Pole facing upwards, The Blue Marble shows Earth from the Mediterranean Sea to Antarctica. This was the first time the Apollo trajectory and seasonal timing made it possible to photograph the south polar ice cap, despite the Southern Hemisphere being heavily covered in clouds. In addition to the Arabian Peninsula and Madagascar, almost the entire coastline of Africa and most of the Indian Ocean are clearly visible, a cyclone in the Indian Ocean is also visible, the South Asian mainland and Australia are on the eastern limb, and the eastern part of South America lies on the western limb. The Blue Marble was preceded by two photos with the same perspective, which were taken immediately prior.

NASA has also applied the name to a 2012 series of images which cover the entire globe at relatively high resolution. These were created after a search of satellite pictures taken over time found as many cloudless photographs as possible for use in the final images. NASA has verified that the 2012 "blue marble" images are composites, made from multiple images taken from low Earth orbit, an altitude whose narrow field of view does not allow of photographing the entire planet at once. Likewise, these images do not fit together properly and, because of lighting, weather and cloud interference, it is impossible to collect cohesive or fully clear images of the entire Earth simultaneously.

== Background ==
The Blue Marble was not the first clear color image taken of an illuminated face of Earth, since such images by satellites had already been made and released as early as 1967.

Before the Blue Marble, a picture of the fully illuminated Earth by the ATS-3 satellite was used in 1968 by Stewart Brand for his Whole Earth Catalog, after campaigning since 1966 to have NASA release a then-rumored satellite image of the entire Earth as seen from space. He got inspired during an LSD trip, seeing a "psychedelic illusion" of the Earth's curvature, convincing him that a picture of the entire planet would change how humans related to it. He sold and distributed buttons for 25 cents each that asked: "Why haven't we seen a photograph of the whole Earth yet?" During this campaign, Brand met Buckminster Fuller, who offered to help Brand with his project. Several of the pins made their way to NASA employees.

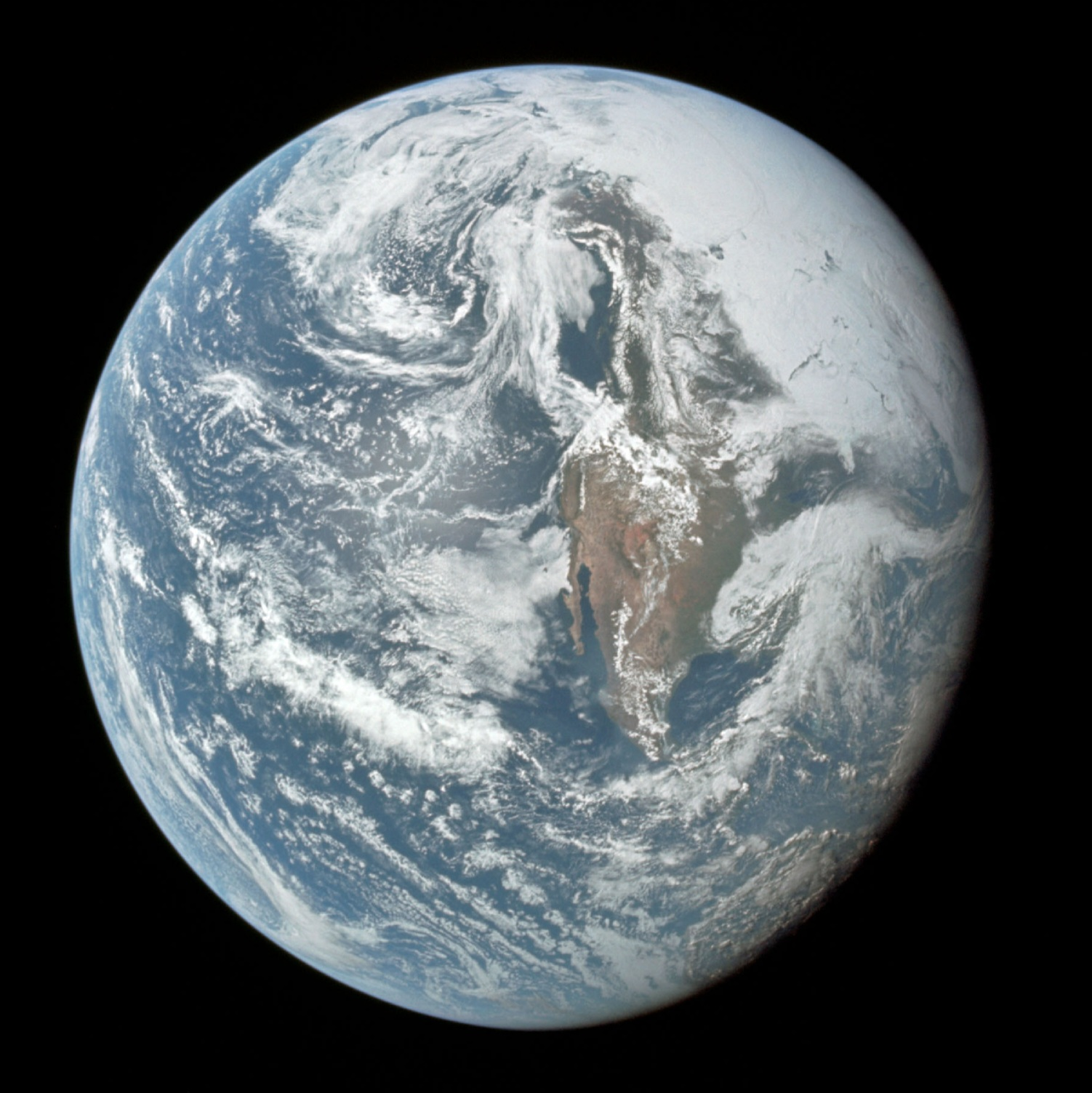
While the first image of the whole Earth was taken in 1967, this photograph by the crew of Apollo 10 from 1969 was used in the first version of the Earth Flag, before the Blue Marble was used instead

In the same year the popular photograph Earthrise was taken by William Anders of Apollo 8 and eventually in 1969 the crew of Apollo 10 took a photo of the almost completely illuminated Earth, which was then used for the first version of the Earth Flag, before being replaced by the Blue Marble photo.

== Circumstance ==
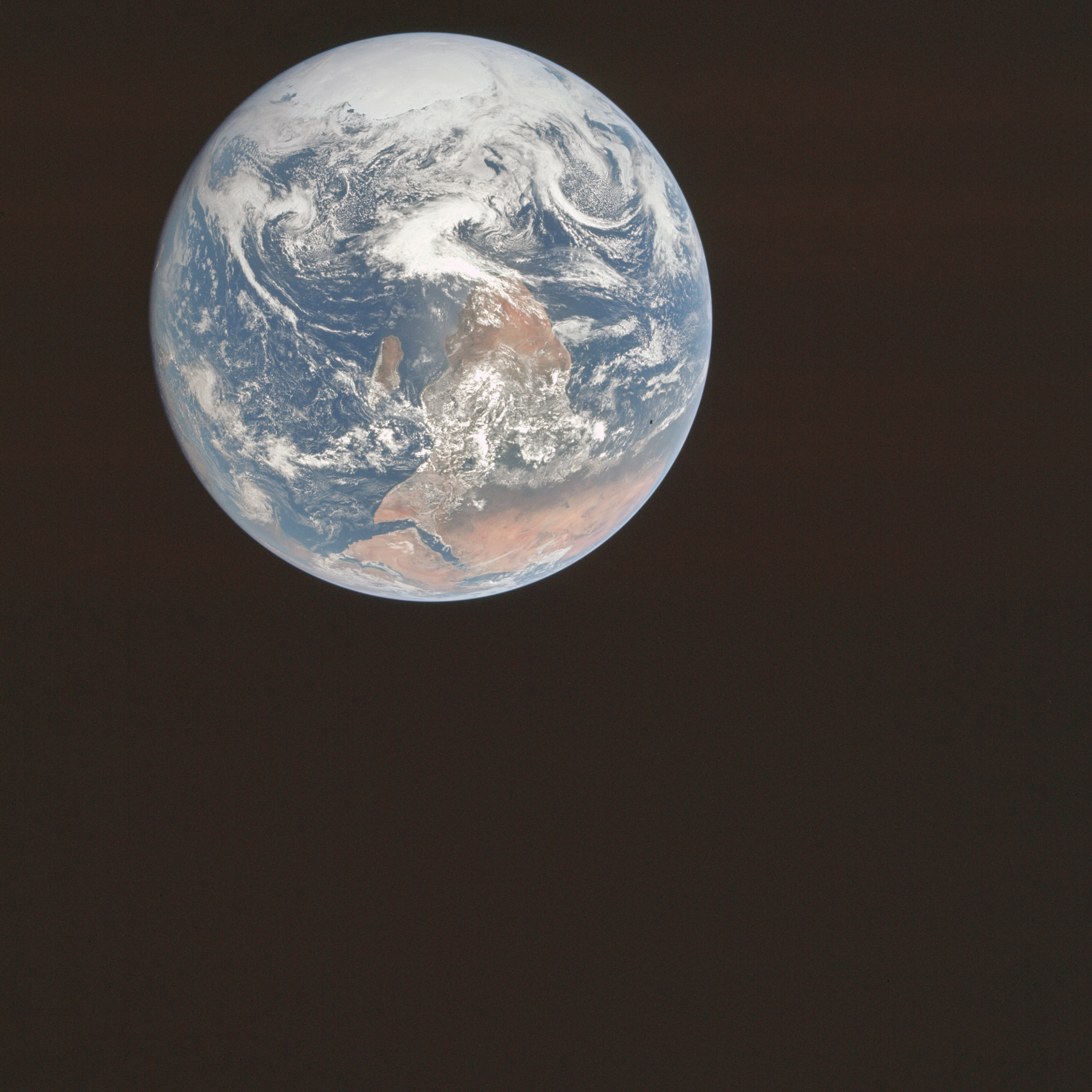
Original image, uncropped, uncorrected, and unrotated, with south-up orientation (Lunar and Planetary Institute, Apollo Image Atlas version)

The photograph was taken on December 7, 1972, aboard the Apollo 17 command module with callsign America.

Apollo 17 was the first mission that had the opportunity to photograph most of the Earth face completely lit in daylight, an opportunity prepared for and tightly observed and vividly described by the crew.

Animation of the full Blue Marble photo sequence, as seen by the crew of Apollo 17

The astronauts had the Earth's South Pole facing upwards and the Sun above them (in spatial navigation terms, to their zenith) when they took the image. To the astronauts, the Earth had the appearance and size of a glass marble.

Hemispheric map of the view of The Blue Marble

At that time, Africa was in noon daylight and with the December solstice approaching, Antarctica was also illuminated. The picture has a 50% (26-50%) cloud cover, and shows many weather systems, featuring a Shapyro–Keyser cyclone near to the center of the image. Cyclone Sixteen (16B) can be seen in the upper right of the image. This storm had brought flooding and high winds to the Indian state of Tamil Nadu on December 5, two days before the photograph was taken.

According to the photograph description by NASA it was taken at 05:39 a.m EST (10:39 UTC), 5 hours 6 minutes after launch of the Apollo 17 mission, and about 1 hour 54 minutes after the spacecraft left its parking orbit around Earth to begin its trajectory to the Moon. Alternatively, Eric Hartwell has identified it as having been taken slightly earlier at 5 hours 3 minutes, when one crew member states having changed the f-number, presumably between AS17-148-22725, the first of the sequence of photos, and the following less exposed images like The Blue Marble.

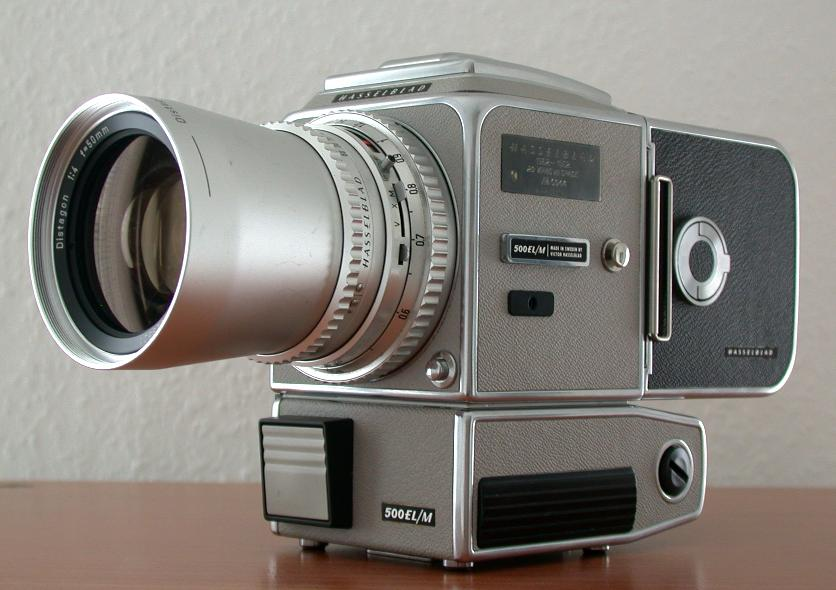
A copy of the modified Hasselblad 500 EL camera used

The photograph was made using a Hasselblad 500 EL camera with a Zeiss Planar lens of 80 mm focal length using Kodak Ektachrome SO-368 film; the lens aperture was set at f/2.8 and the shutter speed was 1/250 of a second.

== Release ==
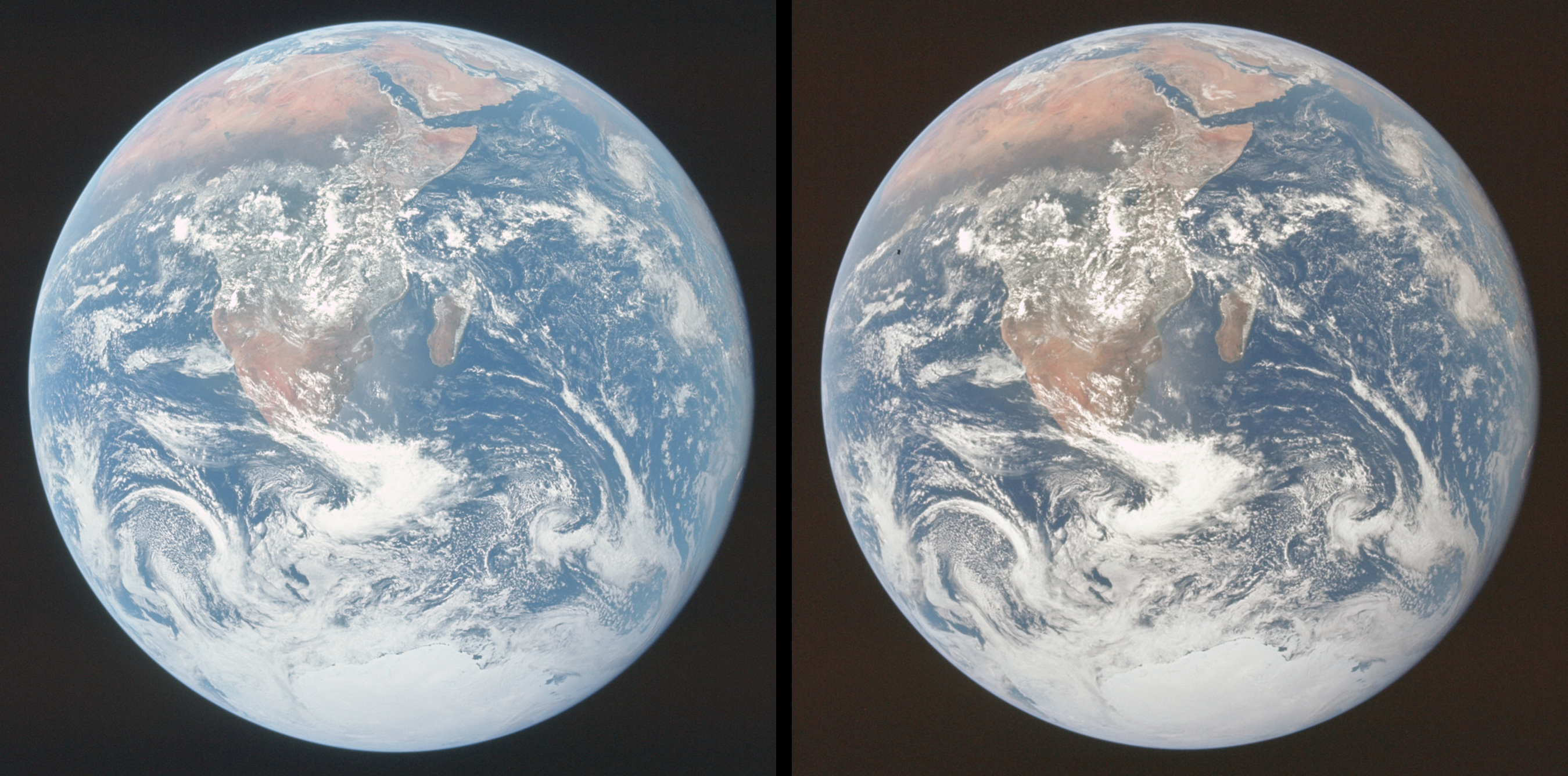
Stereo cross-eye image comparison of AS17-148-22725 and AS17-148-22727 (the Blue Marble), first and last of the photo sequence

The photograph's official NASA designation is AS17-148-22727. It is the third of a sequence of shots which were taken just before and are nearly identical, NASA photograph AS17-148-22725 and AS17-148-22726, the second also having been used as a full-Earth image.

The widely published versions are cropped, rotated with south pointing up relative to the capsule, and chromatically adjusted from the original photographs.

=== Authorship ===
NASA generally credits images to the whole crew of a mission. All crew members, Gene Cernan, Ronald Evans and Harrison Schmitt, took photographs during the mission with the onboard Hasselblad. They have largely avoided definitively answering the question of the photographer's identity by each member claiming to have taken it. However, interviews and evidence examined by Eric Hartwell after the mission suggest that Schmitt was the photographer. For example, in 2013, Schmitt gave a phone interview for the website The Phoblographer in which he explained some of the camera settings, and recalled that the reason the photograph was taken stemmed from his hobby as an amateur meteorologist, with weather prediction being a personal mission goal; Schmitt did not anticipate the image's popular acclaim.

=== Processing ===
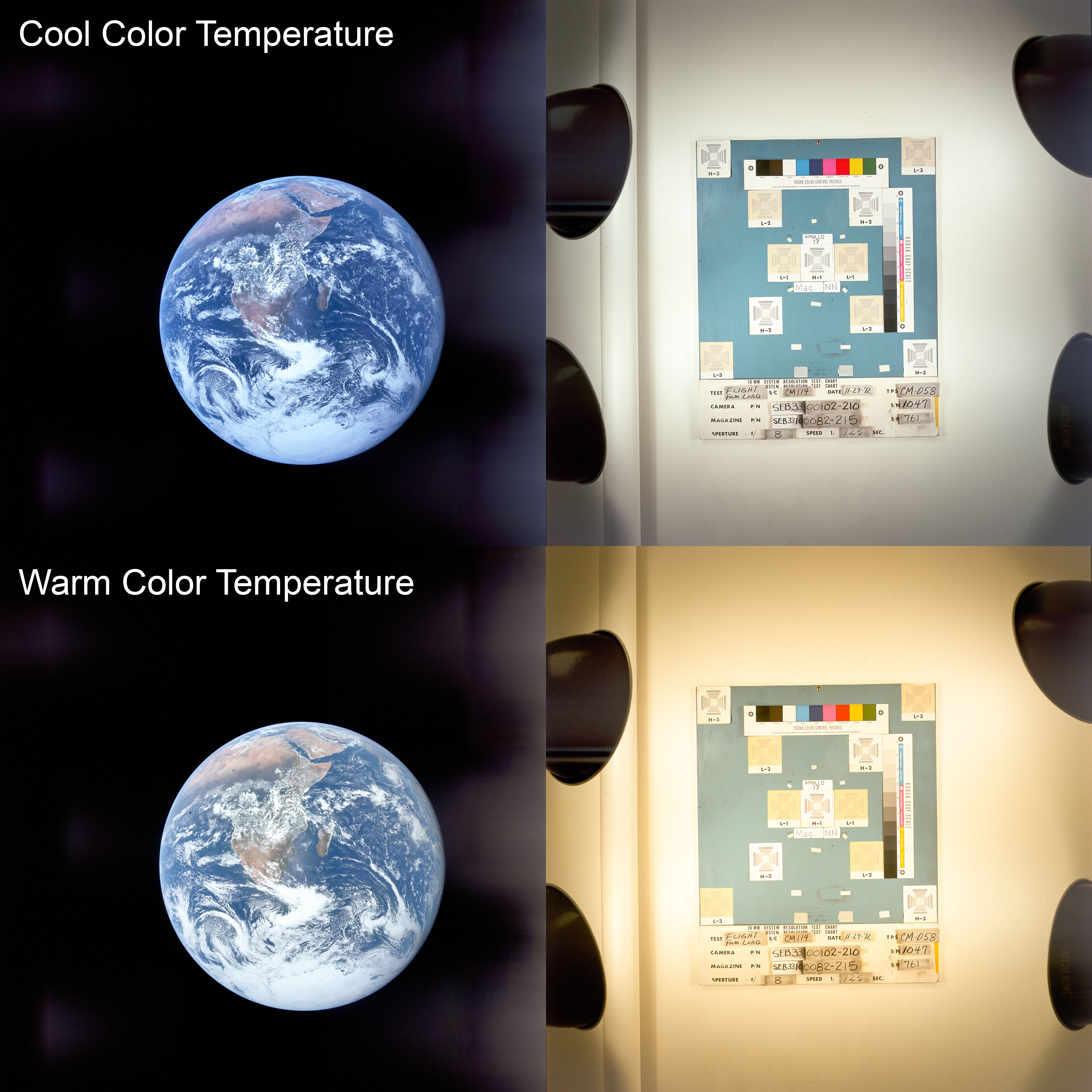
A comparison of different white-balanced Blue Marble images

The original camera film was rescanned in 2007 by the Arizona State University (ASU) for their Apollo Image Archive, producing an extremely high resolution raw version.

Chronological gallery of released versions

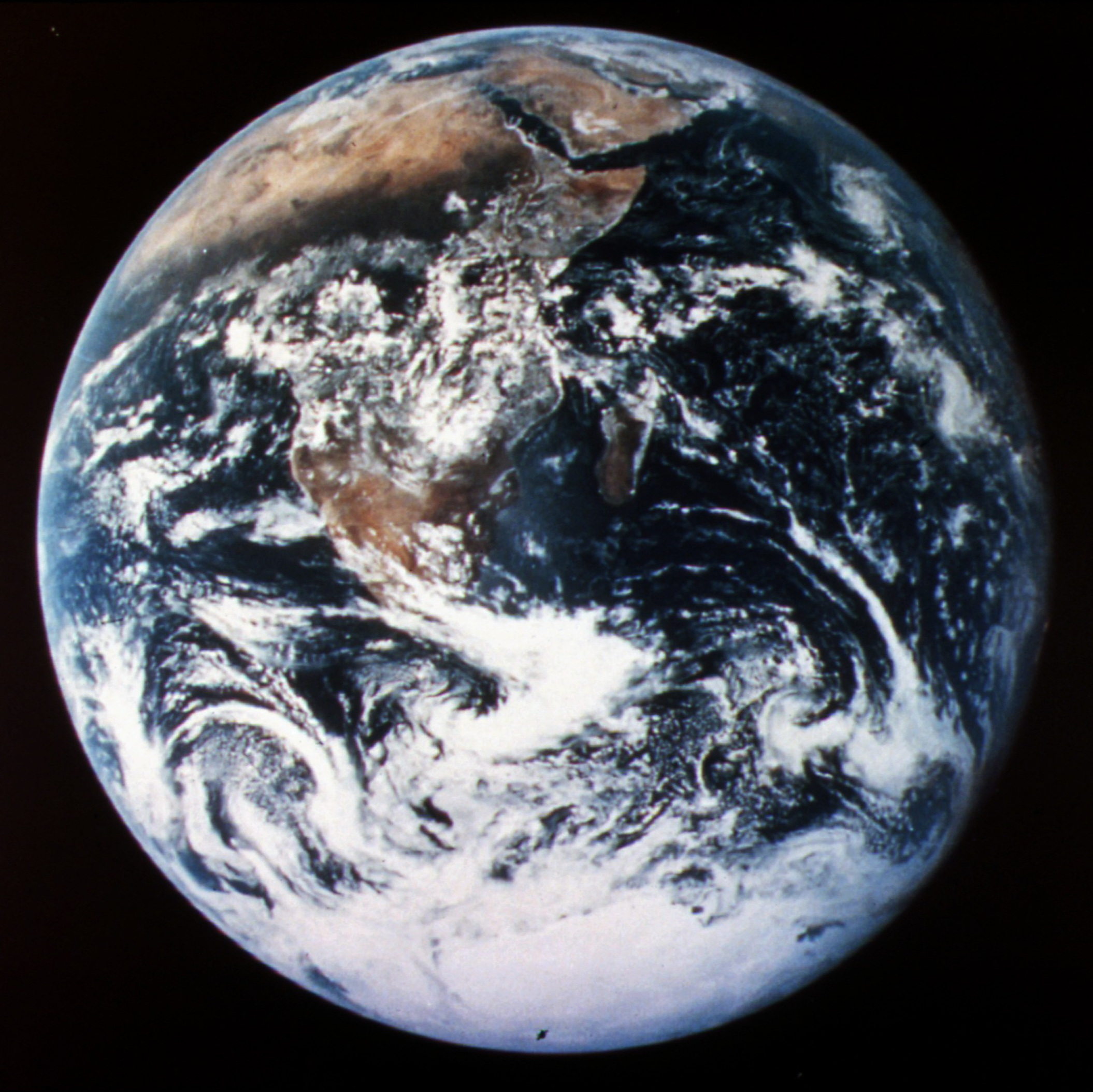
Scan of a 1977 DOCUMERICA (EPA) archived copy

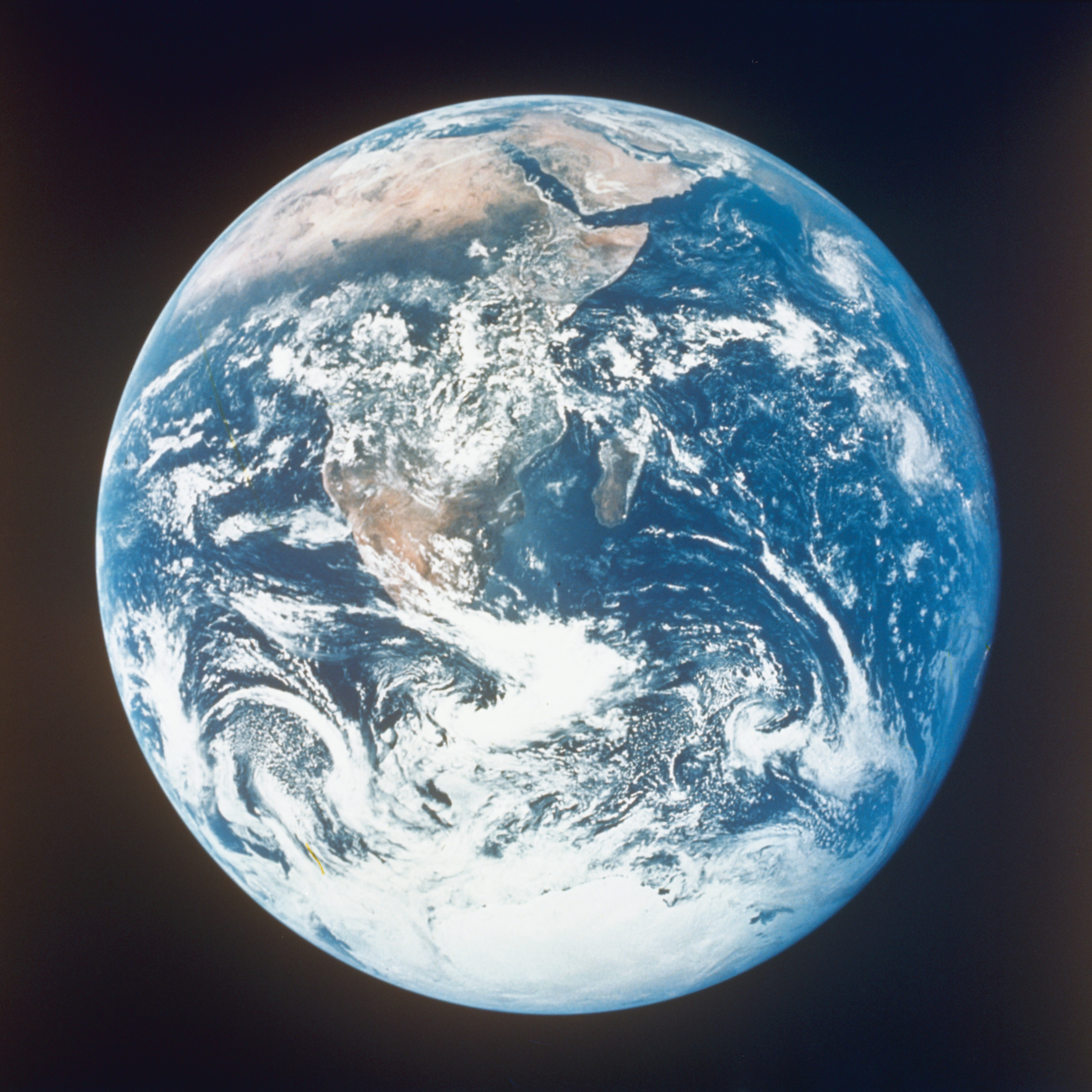
Scan of a NASA archived copy from 1979

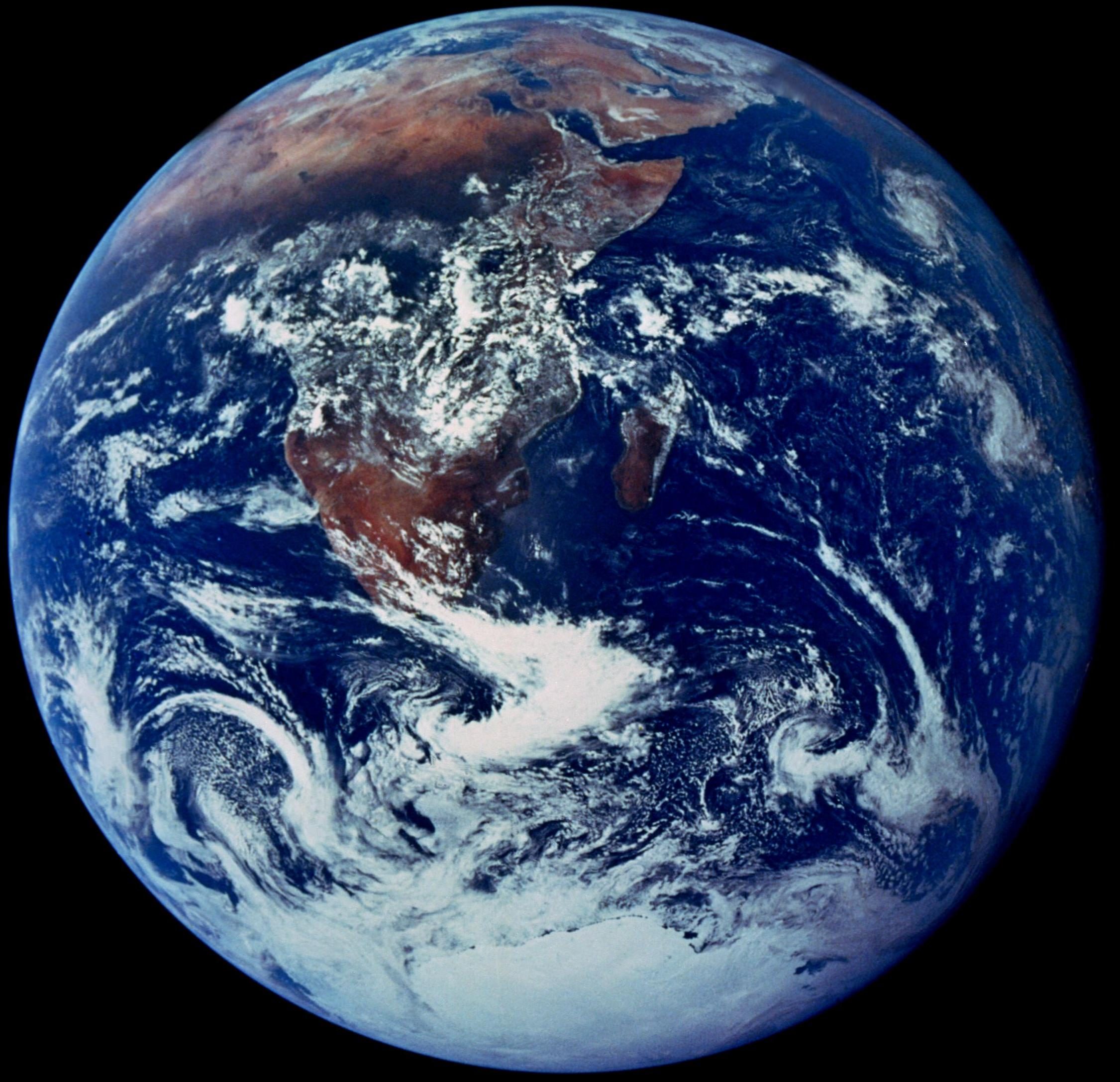
NASA Langley Research Center - Multimedia Repository 1996 copy

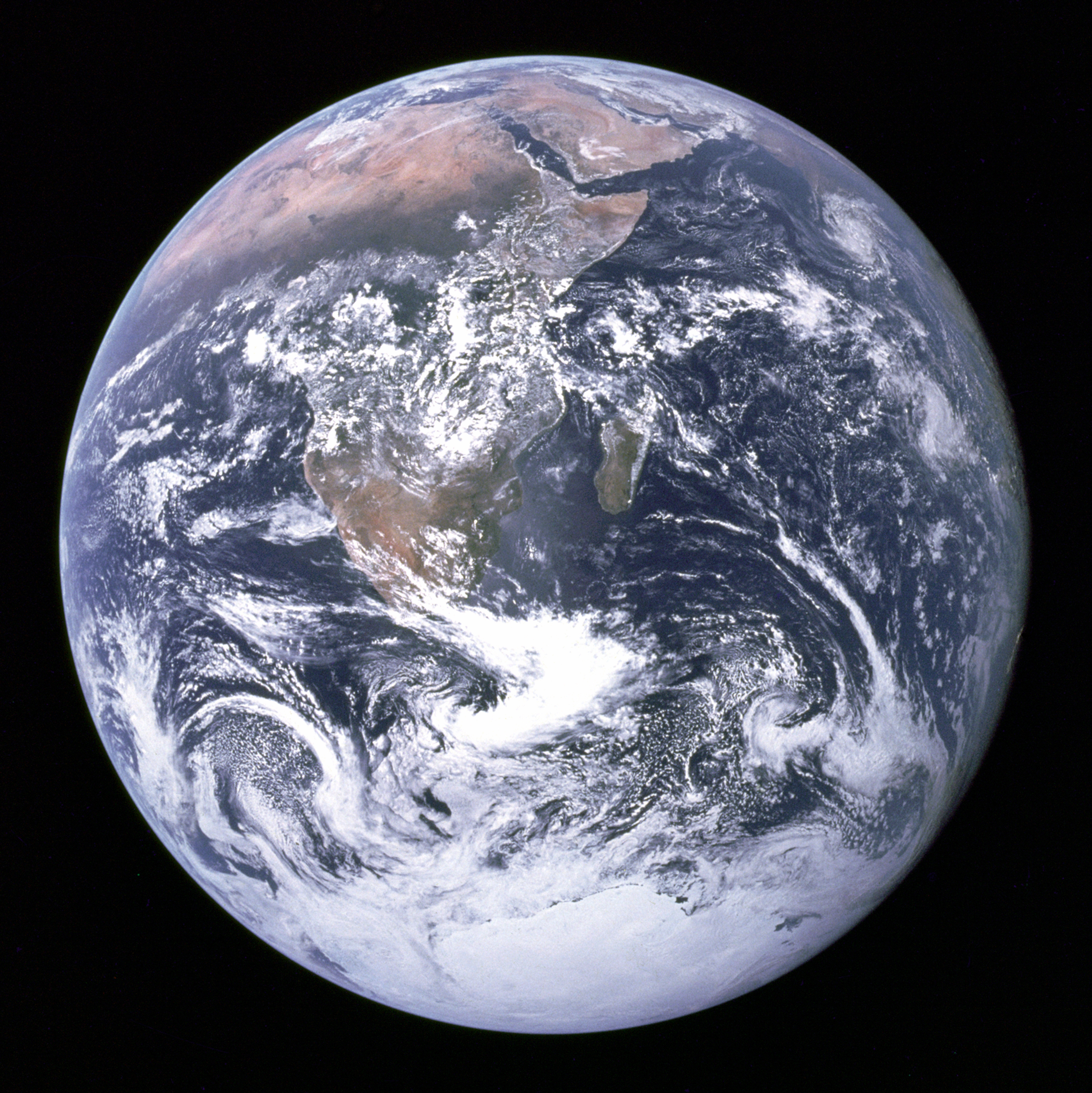
Great Images in NASA (GRIN) version from 2000

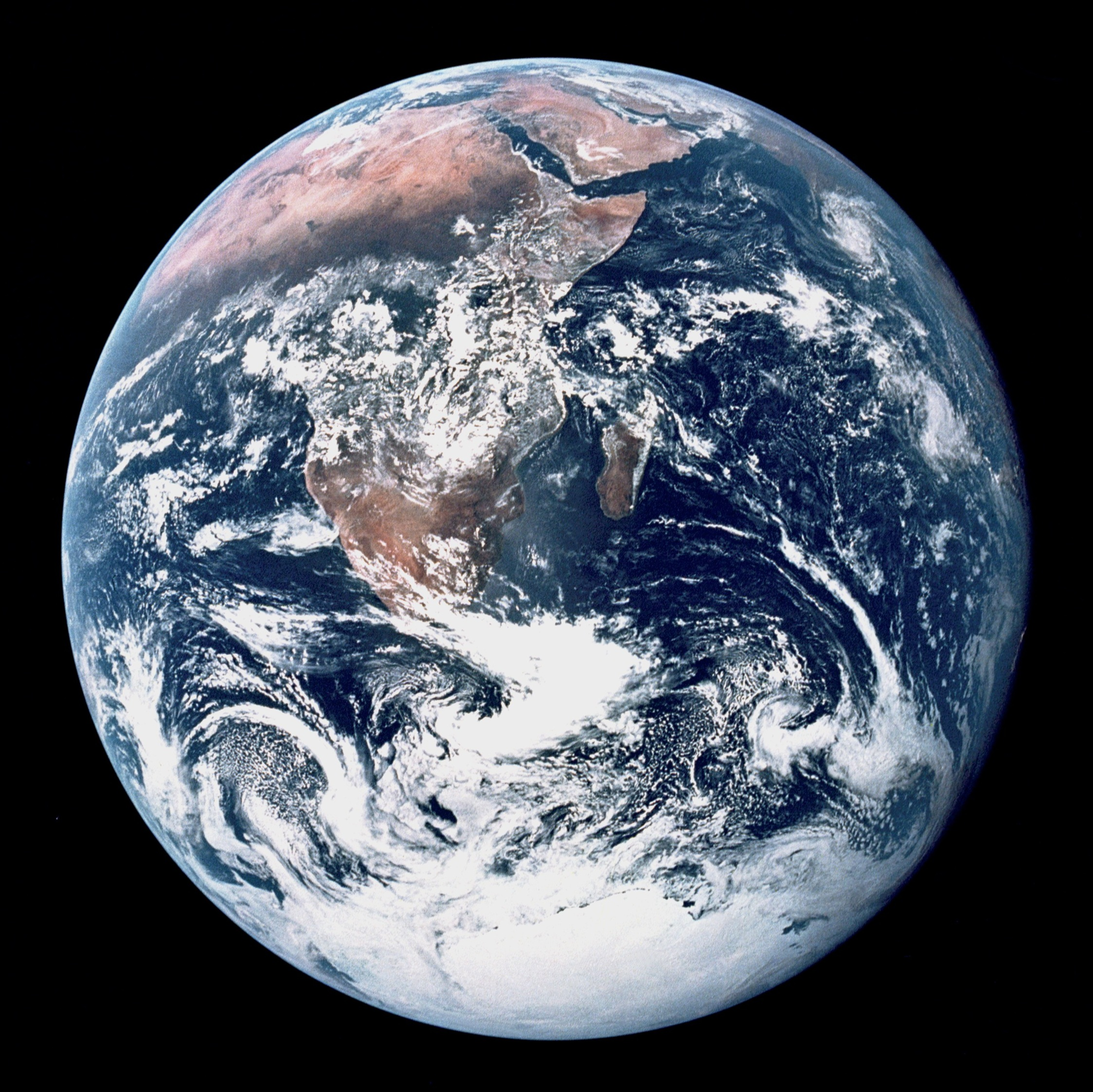
NASA Spaceflight website version (2002)

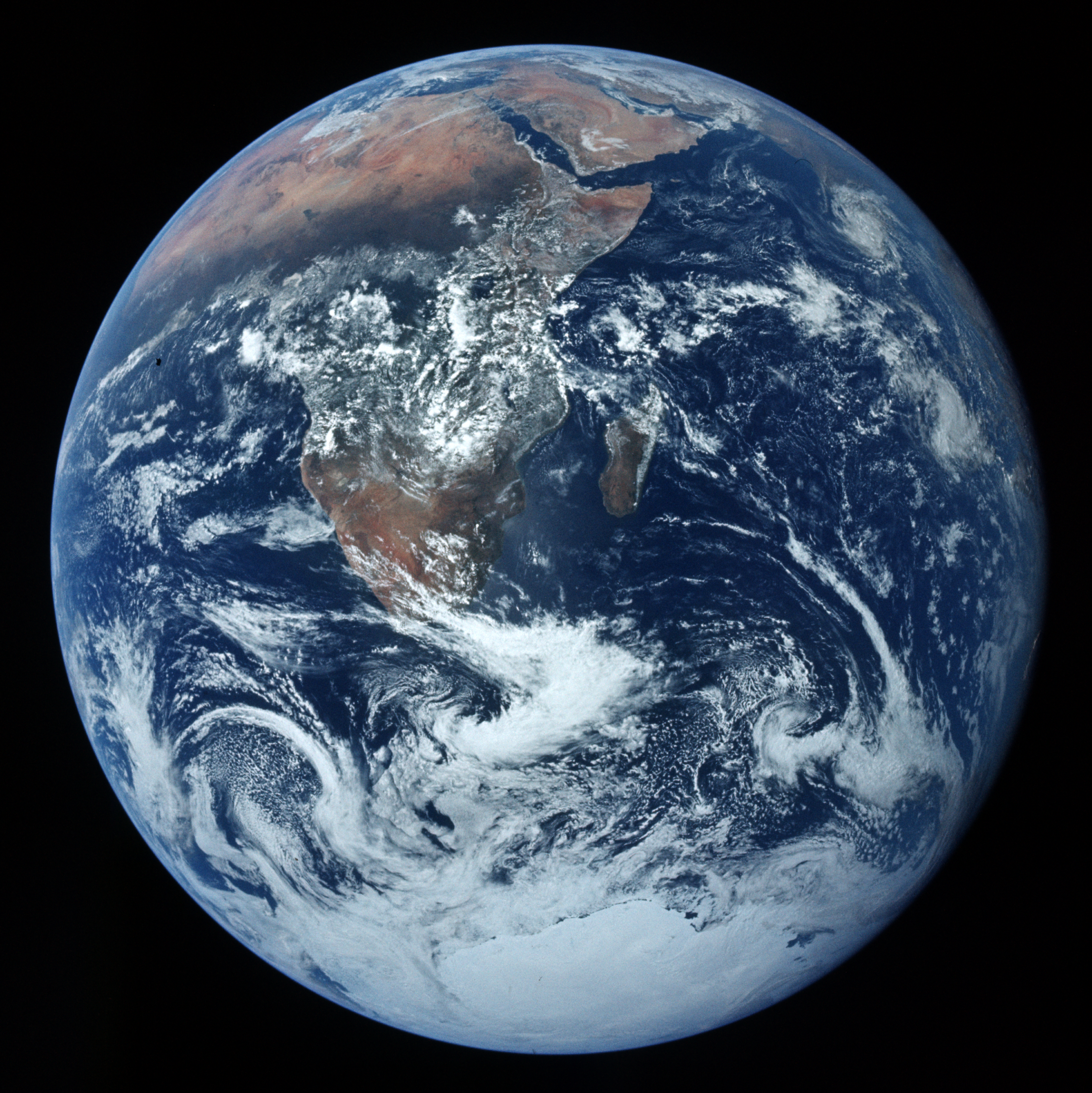
2007 rescanned high resolution version by the ASU Apollo Image Archive

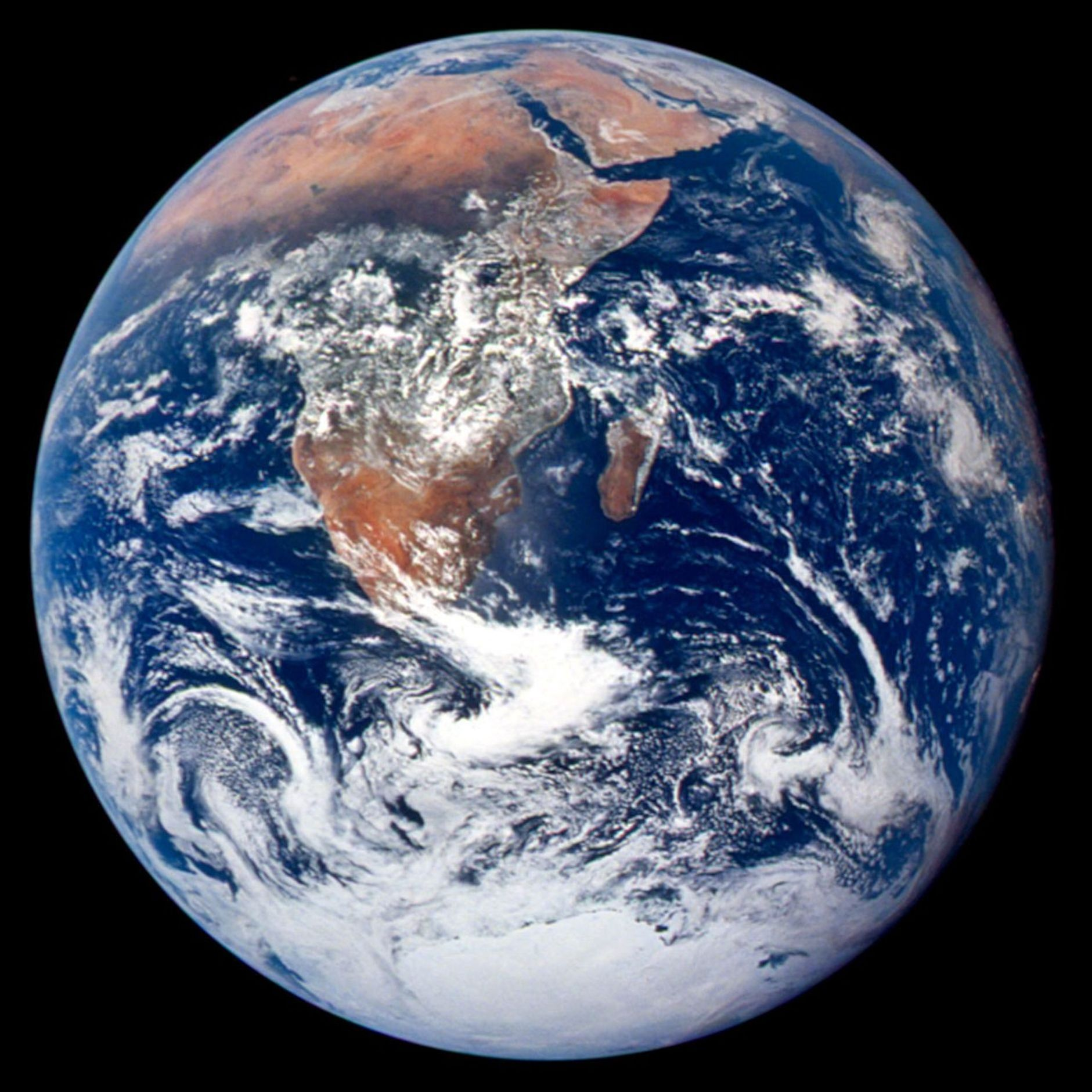
Version used on NASA Science website (2011) and NASA Johnson Space Center's Gateway to Astronaut Photography of Earth (GAPE)

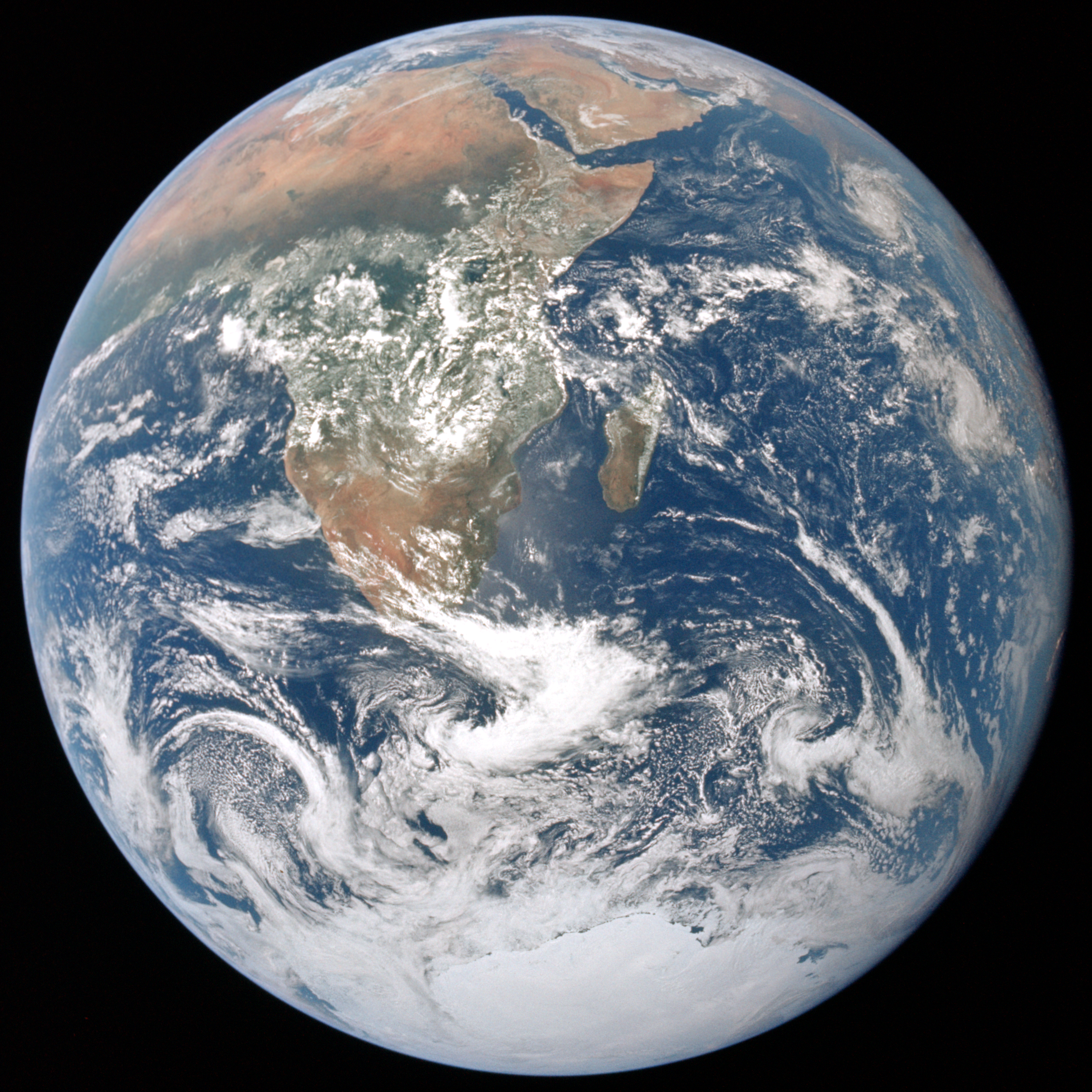
Processed version from 2015 by NASA, produced for NASA's so-called hyperwall display

== Legacy ==
The photo is part of a sequence of photos, which altogether are the first images of the complete disc of Earth taken by a human and of the South Pole, which was illuminated because of December solstice coming up, having Earth's Southern Hemisphere oriented towards the Sun.

The image was released on 23 December, four days after Apollo 17 landed back on Earth. While not a dominant topic of news reporting at the time, newspapers widely picked the picture for their Apollo 17 reporting over the festive season, with the Boston Globe using it as the cover image of its Christmas issue. The name Blue Marble was coined back then.

The image became NASA's most requested image, and according to NASA archivist Mike Gentry, The Blue Marble is among the most widely distributed images in history. Withstanding time despite newer photographs of Earth, because of reasons such as that it is an historically iconic photo and taken by a human instead of a satellite.

It is often given as an example for the sublime or awe inspiring so-called overview effect, highlighting and contextualizing the scale of Earth and the thin atmosphere and the interdependence of everything. Rendering borders invisible this perspective has been an argument for transnational approaches to the world and its issues.

The view of the photo showing Africa so dominantly has been described by on-board astronaut and geologist Harrison Schmitt as reminding him of human migration from its origins in Africa to now eventually into the Solar System, and Earth as a whole as a place of resilient diversity. Africa's visibility has been also noted as an imagery impressive in the context of decolonization ongoing at the time in Africa. Beside for Africa's appearance, the photo has also been noted for its unusual viewing angle, focusing on the Southern Hemisphere, and details like a cyclone over Southern India, illustrating Earth as a varied and dynamic place.

As such it has been called a "manifesto for global justice" and spaceflight altogether as discovering Earth.

=== Environmental movement, Earth flag, and anthem ===
The image was released during a surge in environmental activism during the 1970s, and became a symbol of the environmental movement, as a depiction of Earth's fragility, vulnerability, and isolation amid the vast expanse of space.

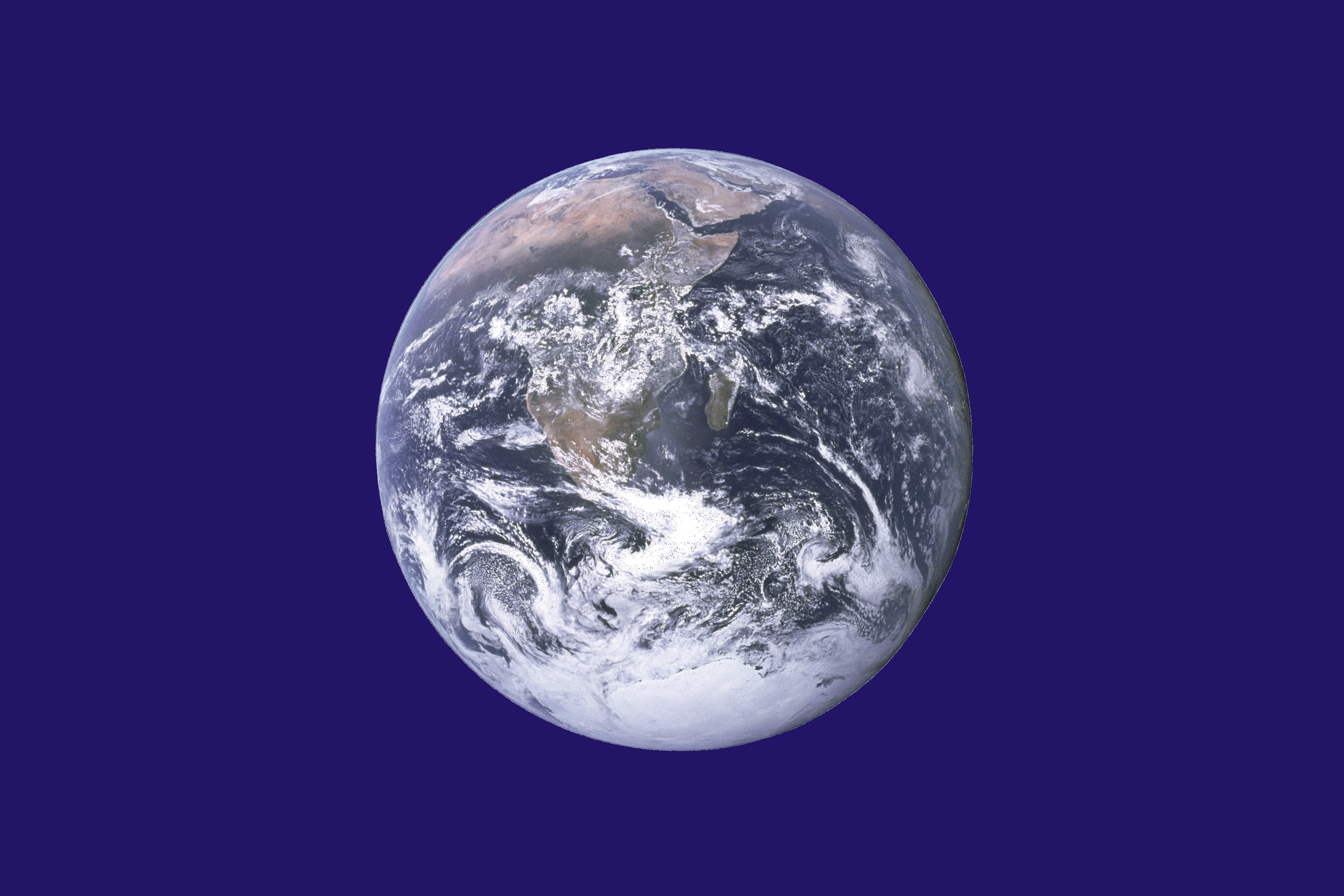
The 1973 version of the Earth Flag, proposed by John McConnell using The Blue Marble

The phrase "blue marble" (as well as the picture itself) is frequently used, as in the Earth flag by environmental activist organizations or companies attempting to promote an environmentally conscious image.

Poet-diplomat Abhay Kumar penned an Earth anthem inspired by the Blue Marble which contains "all the peoples and the nations of the world, one for all, all for one, united we unfurl the blue marble flag".

=== Other references ===
The image has been used to validate state-of-the-art atmospheric reanalysis fifty years after it was taken.

There has also been a children's television program called Big Blue Marble.

== Subsequent Blue Marble images ==
Subsequent similar images of Earth (including composites at much higher resolution) have also been termed Blue Marble images, some of which forming Blue Marble series.

=== Big Blue Marble (1994) ===
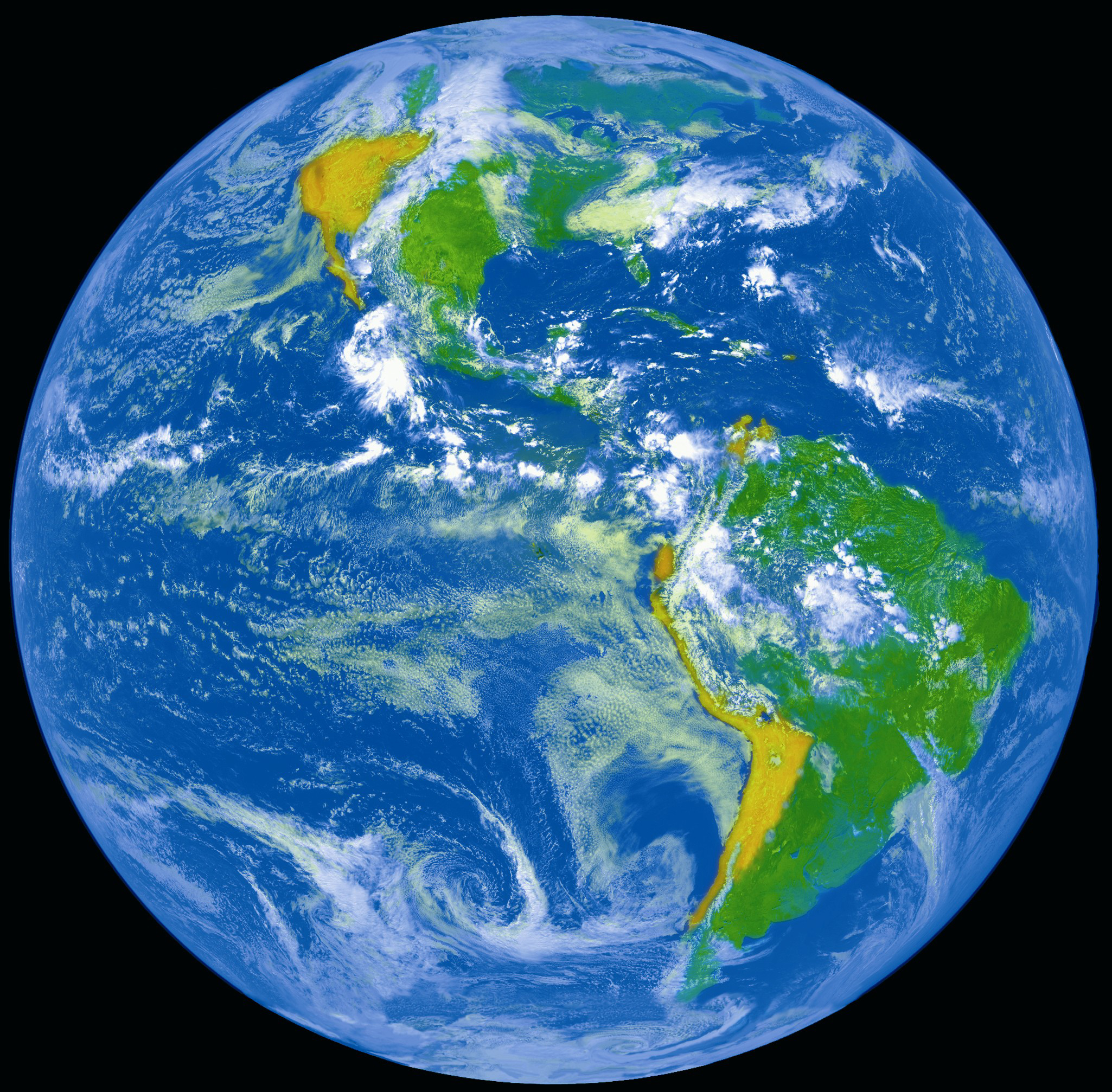
Big Blue Marble by GOES 8 (1994)

In 1994, NASA released an image by GOES 8 titled Big Blue Marble.

=== Blue Marble 2000 ===
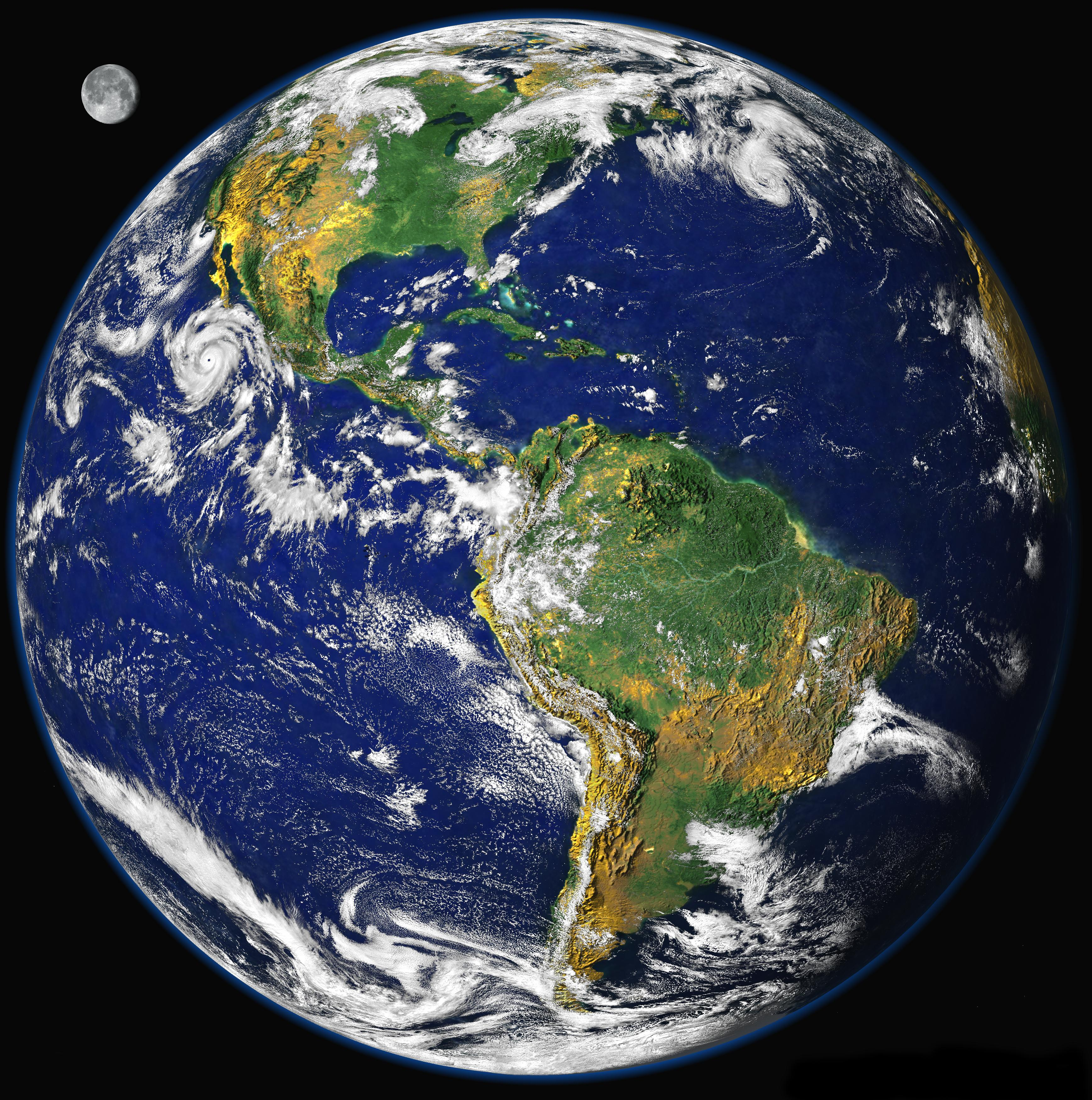
Blue Marble 2000. Hurricane Linda can be seen off the coast of Mexico.

In 2000, there was a so-called Blue Marble 2000 composite image released. It was based on data from 1997 by the Geostationary Operational Environmental Satellite (GOES), Sea-viewing Wide Field-of-view Sensor (SeaWiFS) satellite and Polar Operational Environmental Satellites (POES), complemented with a digital elevation model from the U.S. Geological Survey.

=== Blue Marble 2001 ===
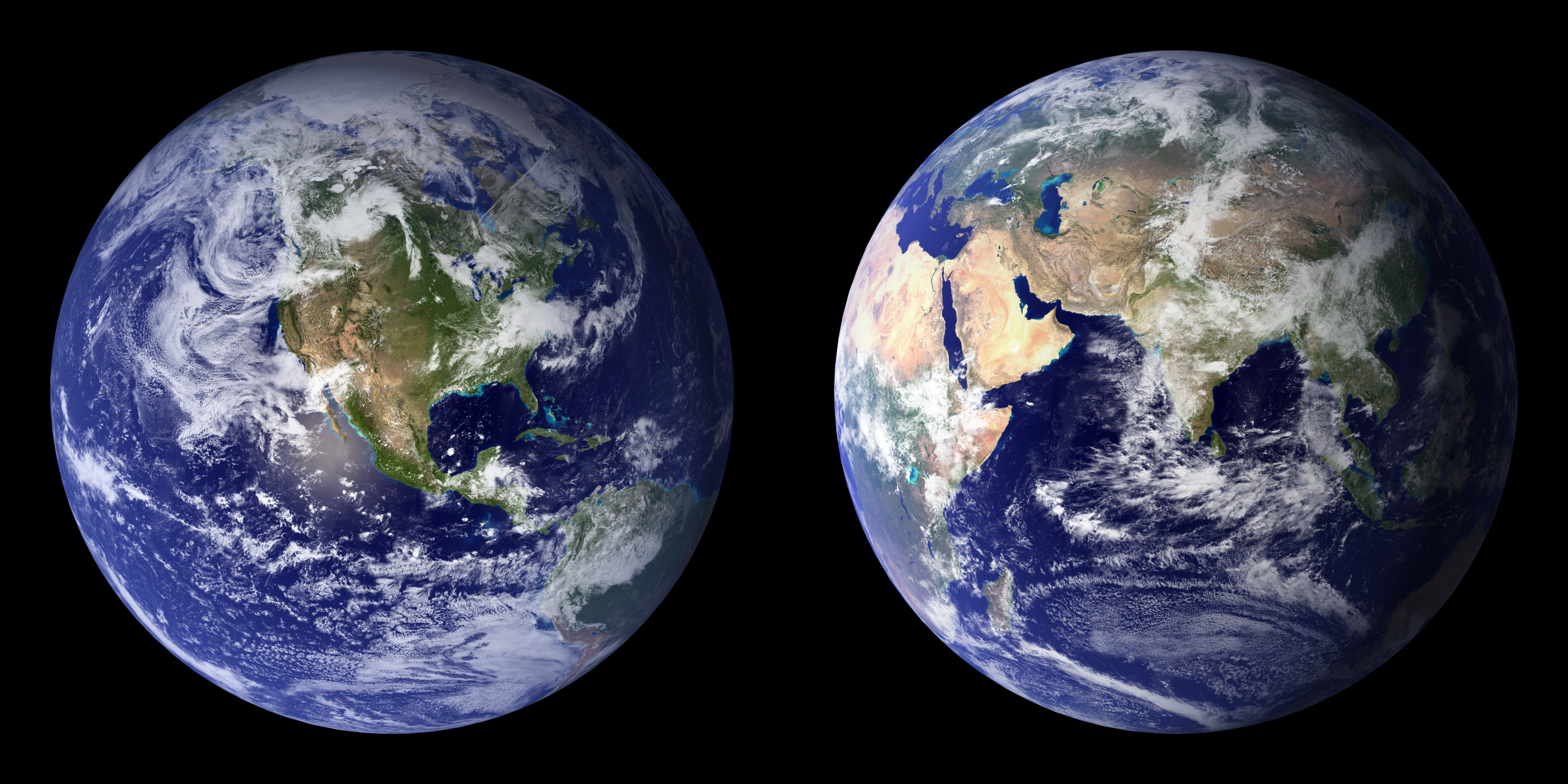
Blue Marble composite images generated by NASA in 2002, based on data from 2001

In 2002, NASA released Blue Marble 2001 images, composite visualizations of Earth based on data collected by NASA's Terra satellite over the course of 4 months in 2001 and 2002, orbiting pole to pole. With a 1 km/pixel resolution the data was at the time the most detailed imagery available for free, and permitted for reuse. Specular maps and color maps were used to generate the images of the Earth, before they were composited onto a computer-generated sphere in Photoshop to create the final result. Also included were cloud-cover and night-light image sets at lower resolutions.

Later, in 2007, one of the visualizations, depicting the Western Hemisphere, by Reto Stöckli and enhanced by Robert Simmon, was notably used as one of the default wallpapers for the first-generation iPhone.

=== Blue Marble Next Generation (2005) ===
NASA Earth Observatory animation called Blue Marble Next Generation (2005), showing Earth in 2004.

A subsequent release was made in 2005, named Blue Marble Next Generation. This series of digital image mosaics was produced with the aid of automated image-sifting upon images from NASA's Earth Observatory, which enabled the inclusion of a complete, cloud-free globe for each month from January to December 2004, at even higher resolution (500 m/pixel). The original release of a single-image set covering the entire globe could not reflect the extent of seasonal snow-and-vegetative cover across both hemispheres, but this newer release closely modeled the changes of the seasons.

A number of interactive viewers for these data have also been released, among them a music visualization for the PlayStation 3 that is based on the texture data.

==== Blue Marble 2007 ====
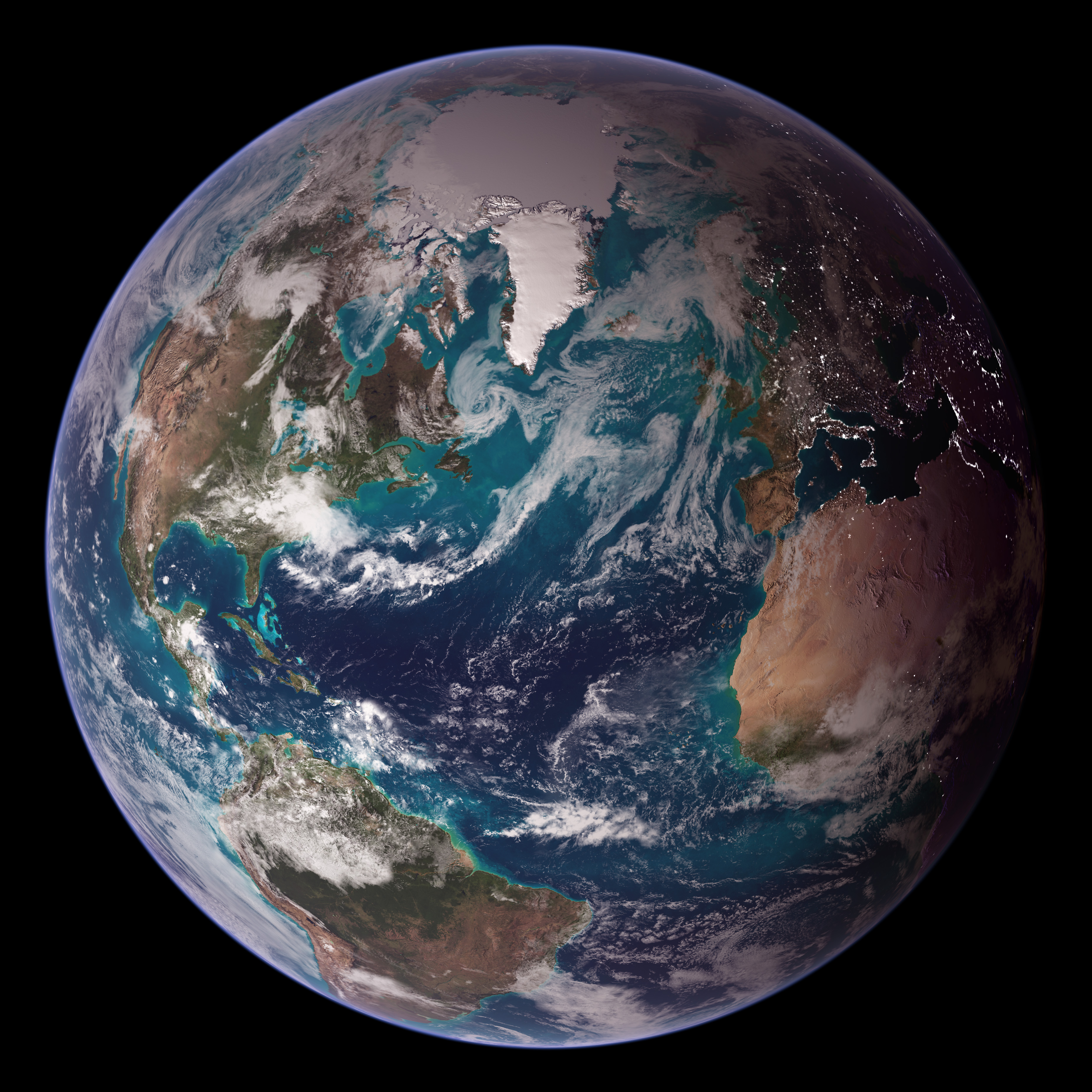
Western Hemispheric view of the Blue Marble 2007 composite global image of Earth

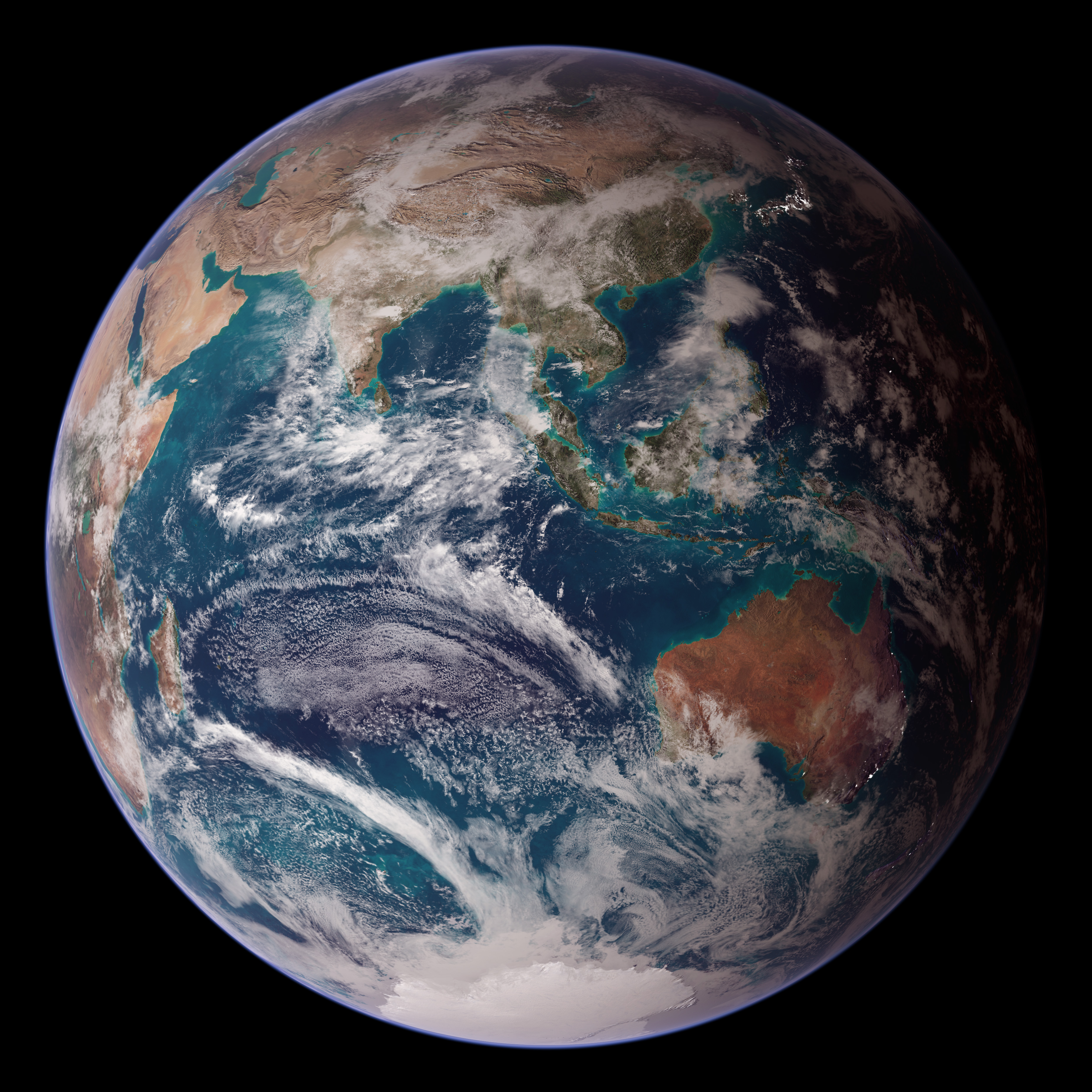
Eastern Hemispheric view of the Blue Marble 2007 composite global image of Earth

Based on data from multiple satellites, from different times, were put together by a team of NASA merging layers of global data about every type of layer of features, from oceanic to atmospheric, to create the Blue Marble 2007.

=== Suomi NPP ===
==== Blue Marble 2012 ====
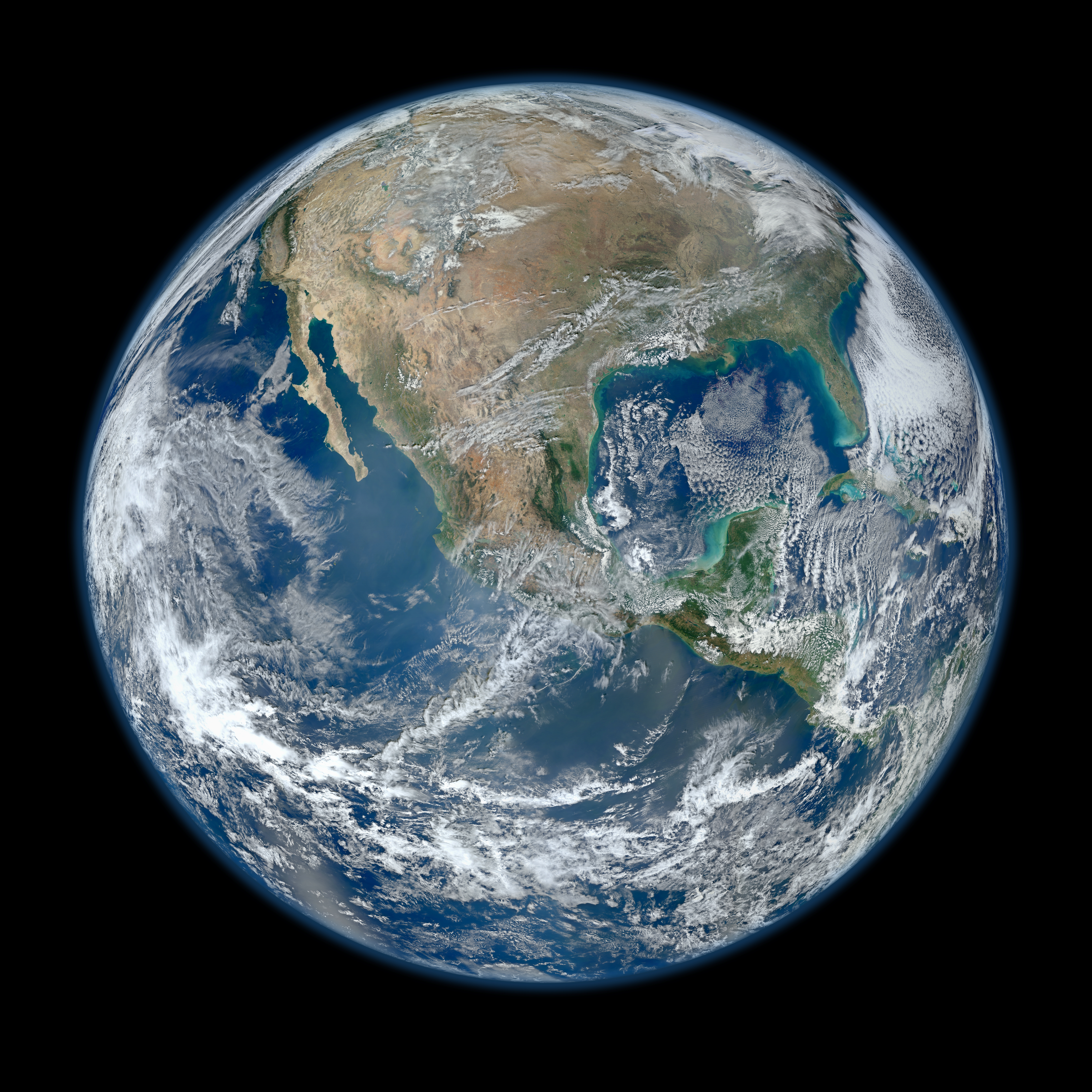
Blue Marble 2012 – a composite satellite image.

On January 25, 2012, NASA released a composite image of the Western Hemisphere of Earth titled Blue Marble 2012. The picture logged over 3.1 million views on the Flickr image hosting website within the first week of release. On February 2, 2012, NASA released a companion to this new Blue Marble, showing a composite image of the Eastern Hemisphere from data obtained on January 23, 2012.

The picture is composed of data obtained by the Visible/Infrared Imager Radiometer Suite (VIIRS) instrument on board the Suomi NPP satellite on January 4, 2012. The data was obtained from six orbits of the Earth by the Suomi NPP over an eight-hour period. The image was created using a near-sided perspective projection with the viewing point placed 2,100 km (1,300 miles) above 20° North by 100° West. This projection results in a very wide-angle presentation such as one might get with a fish-eye lens, and it does not include the whole hemisphere.

Blue Marble 2012 - 'White Marble' Arctic view

The companion to Blue Marble 2012, showing the Eastern Hemisphere

Another composite image from Suomi NPP with a perspective showing the North Pole was in reference to the Blue Marble as Blue Marble 2012 - 'White Marble'.

==== Blue Marble 2014 ====
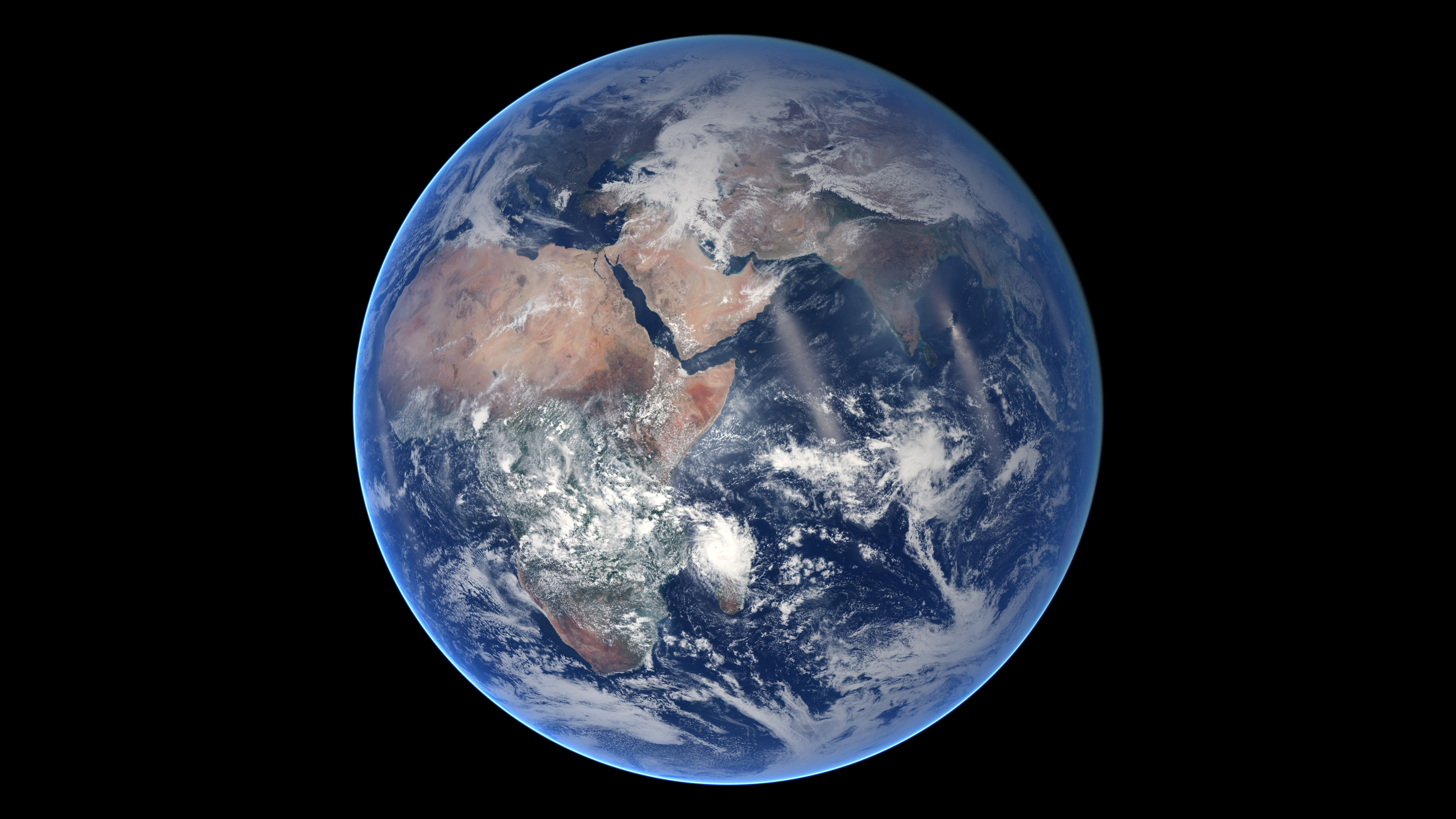
Blue Marble 2014 - Eastern Hemisphere

In 2014, NASA released another Blue Marble image.

==== Black Marble ====
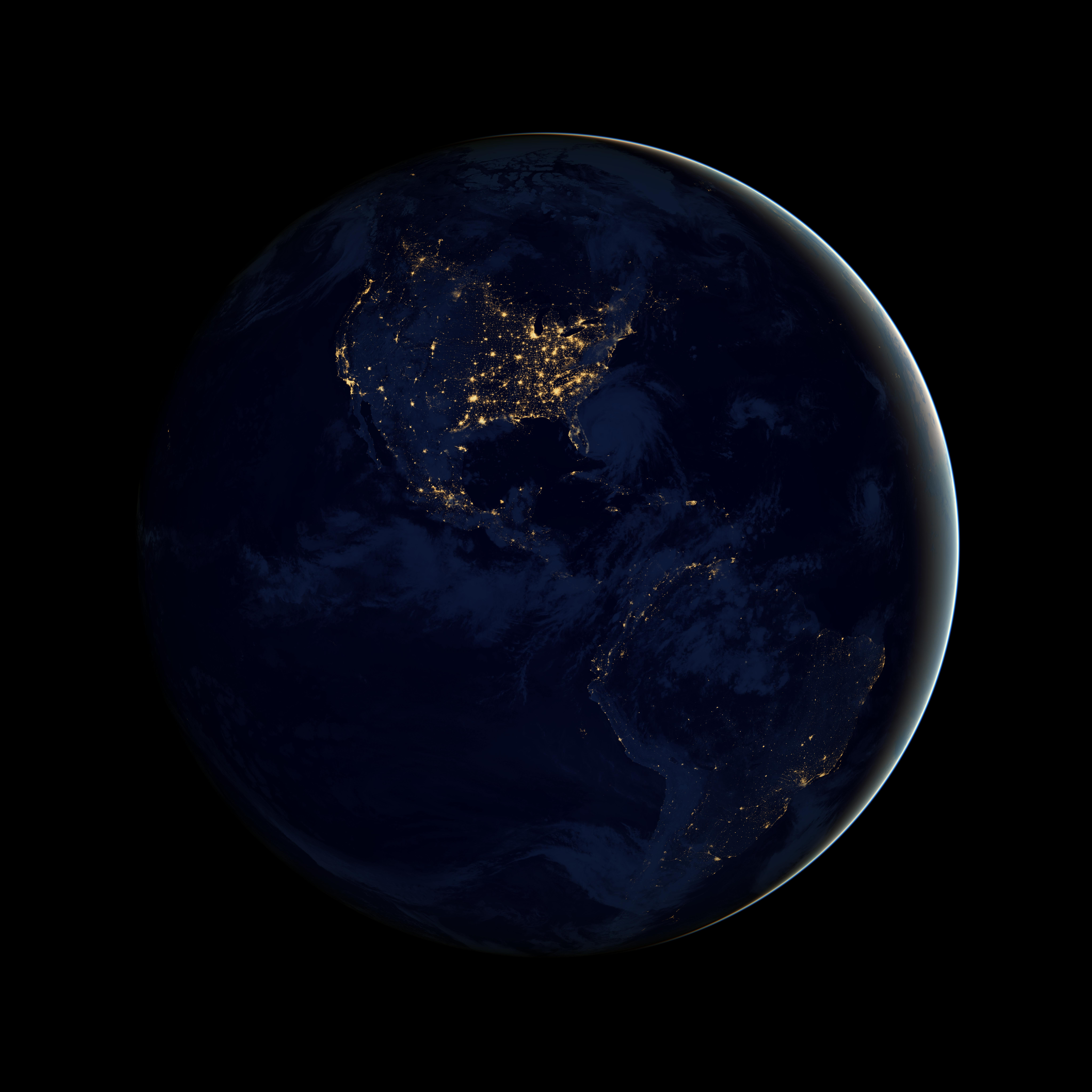
Black Marble – North and South America at night. Hurricane Sandy can be seen off the coast of Florida.

Rotating 2016 version

On December 5, 2012, NASA released a nighttime view of Earth called Black Marble during an annual meeting of Earth scientists held by the American Geophysical Union in San Francisco. The images display all the human and natural matter that glows and can be detected from space. The data was acquired by the Suomi NPP satellite in April and October 2012 and then mapped over existing Blue Marble imagery of Earth to provide a realistic view of the planet. The Suomi NPP satellite completed 312 orbits and gathered 2.5 terabytes of data to get a clear shot of every parcel of the Earth's land surface. Named for satellite meteorology pioneer Verner Suomi, the satellite flies over any given point on Earth's surface twice each day and flies 512 miles (824 km) above the surface in a polar orbit.

The nighttime views were obtained with the new satellite's "day-night band" of the Visible Infrared Imaging Radiometer Suite (VIIRS), which detects light in a range of wavelengths from green to near-infrared, and uses filtering techniques to observe dim signals such as city lights, gas flares, auroras, wildfires, and reflected moonlight. Auroras, fires, and other stray light have been removed in the case of the Black Marble images to emphasize the city lights. The images have been used to study the spatial distribution of economic activity, to select sites for astronomical observatories, and to monitor human activities around protected areas.

Critically the Black Marble has been analyzed as showing the extent of light pollution and the inequality in the world, highlighting heavily built up populated areas of the world more than less built up ones.

=== DSCOVR ===
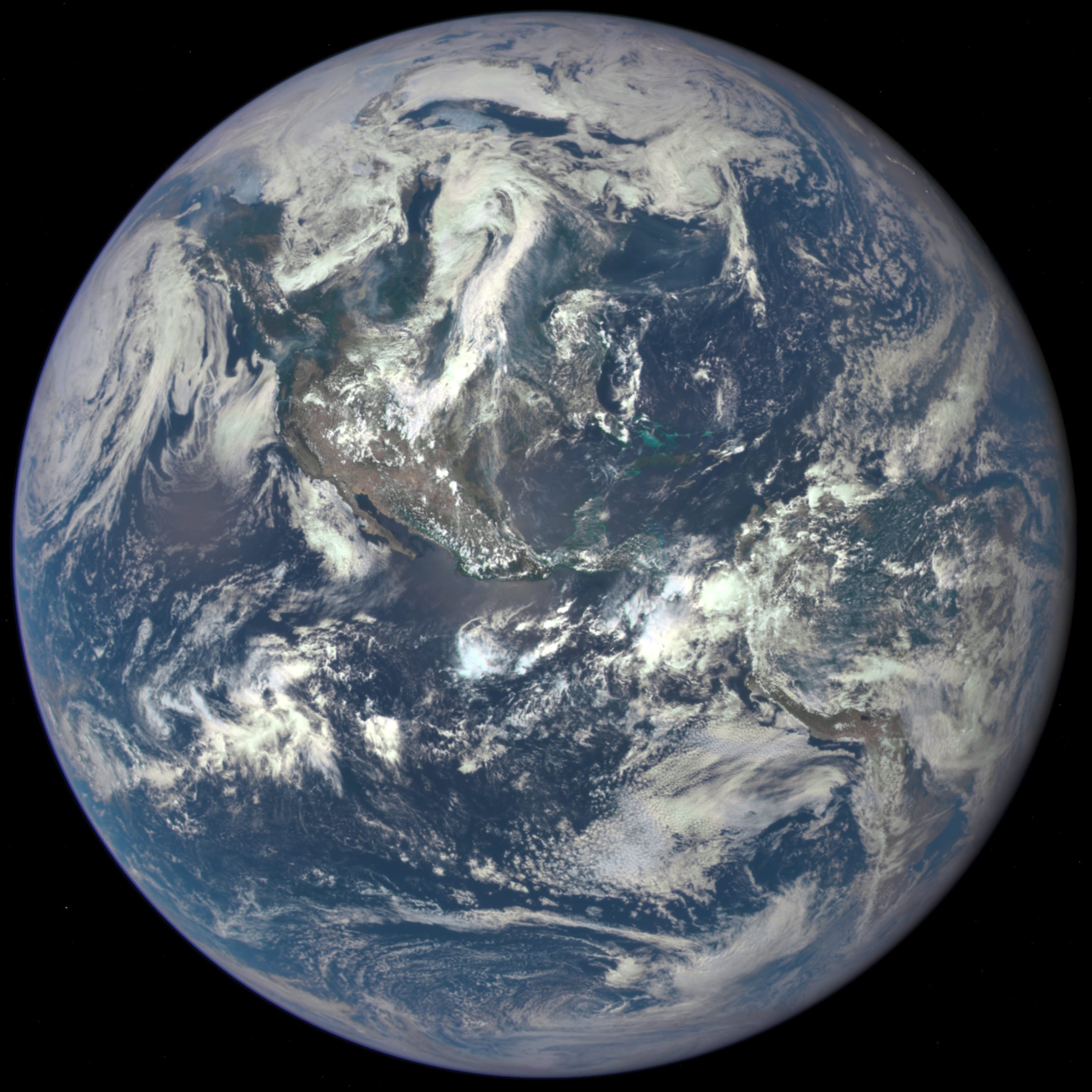
Blue Marble 2015

On July 21, 2015, NASA released a new Blue Marble photograph taken by the U.S. Deep Space Climate Observatory (DSCOVR), a solar weather and Earth observation satellite in Sun-synchronous orbit at the Sun–Earth Lagrange point L1, with a near-continuous day-side view of Earth, which was launched in February 2015. The image was taken on July 6, 2015. The photograph, of the Western Hemisphere, is centered over Central America. The Western United States, Mexico and the Caribbean are visible, but much of South America is hidden beneath cloud cover. Greenland can be seen at the upper edge of the image.

Animations of DSCOVR images by EPIC, likened to the Blue Marble

DSCOVR satellite observing from the Sun–Earth Lagrange point L1 Earth rotating and the Moon passing on its orbit

Satellite time-lapse imagery of Earth's rotation showing axis tilt

April 2022 DSCOVR photos of the same view as the Blue Marble 2001 images, celebrating their 20th anniversary

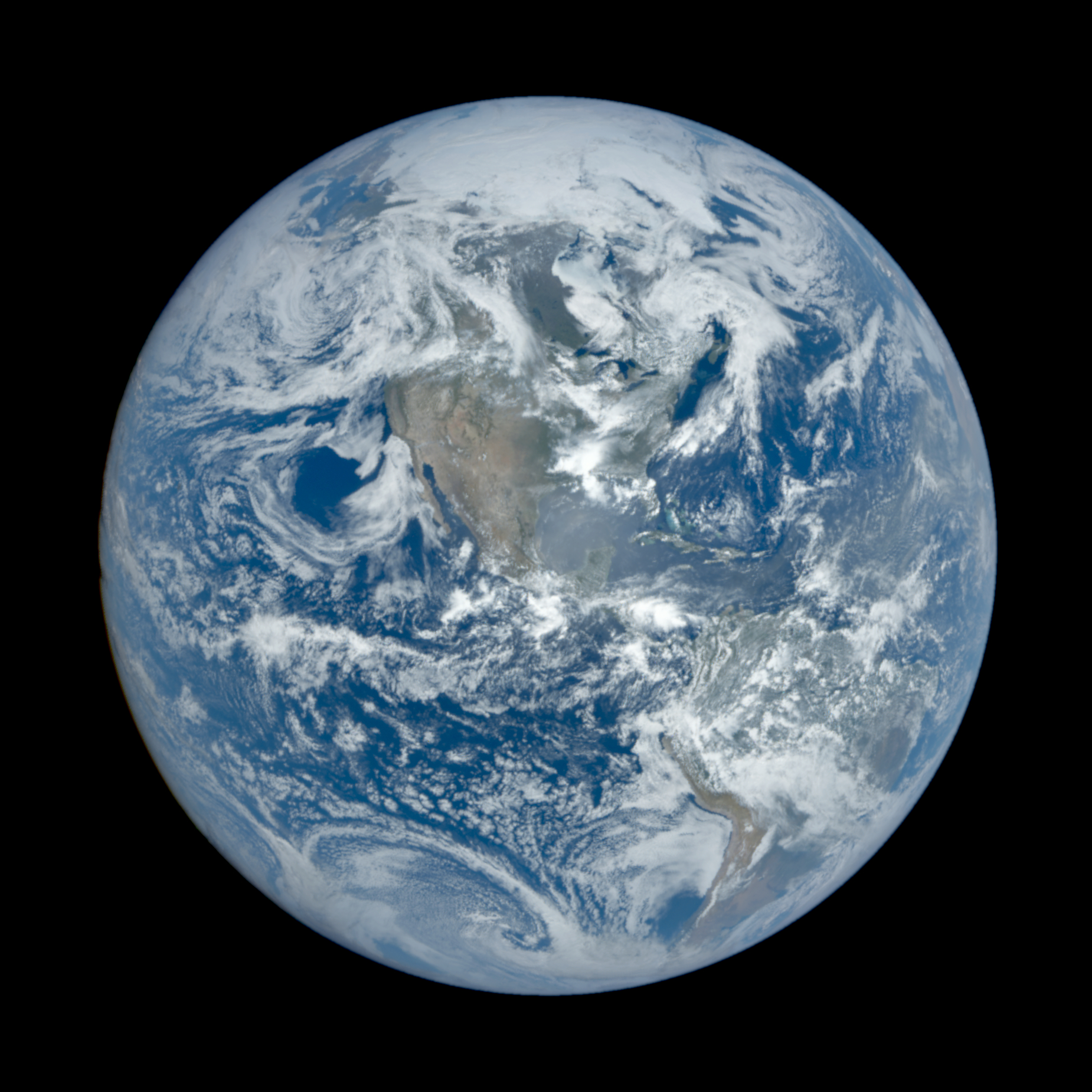
Blue Marble 2022 - Western Hemisphere

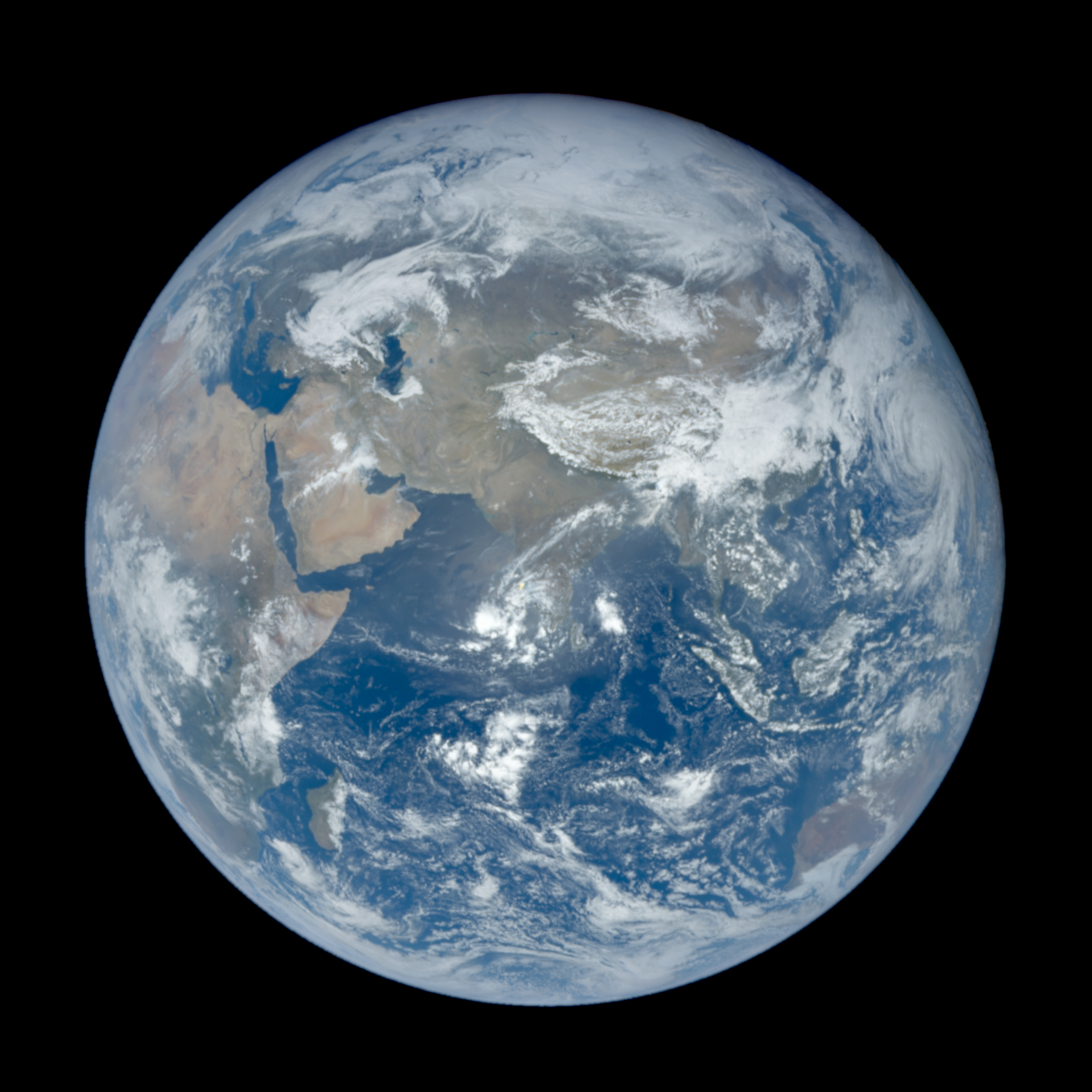
Blue Marble 2022 - Eastern Hemisphere

The EPIC science team plans to upload 13 new color images per day on their website. The color balance has been adjusted to approximate an image that could be seen with the average human eye. In addition to images, scientific information will be uploaded as it becomes available after in-flight calibration is complete. The science information will be ozone and aerosol amounts, cloud reflectivity, cloud height, and vegetation information. The EPIC instrument views the Earth from sunrise in the west to sunset in the east 12 to 13 times per day as the Earth rotates at 15 degrees of longitude per hour. Clearly visible are storms forming over the Atlantic and Pacific Oceans, major slowly moving "cloud rivers", dust aerosol plumes from Africa, the Sun's reflection in the oceans, ship exhaust tracks in the clouds, rivers and lakes, and the variegated land surface patterns especially in the African deserts. The spatial resolution of the color images is about 10 km (6 miles), and the resolution of the science products will be about 20 km (10 miles). Once every three months, lunar images are obtained that are the same as those viewed from Earth during a full Moon. On occasion, the other side of the Moon will appear in the Earth images as the Moon crosses in front of the Earth.

==== Blue Marble 50th anniversary image series (2022) ====
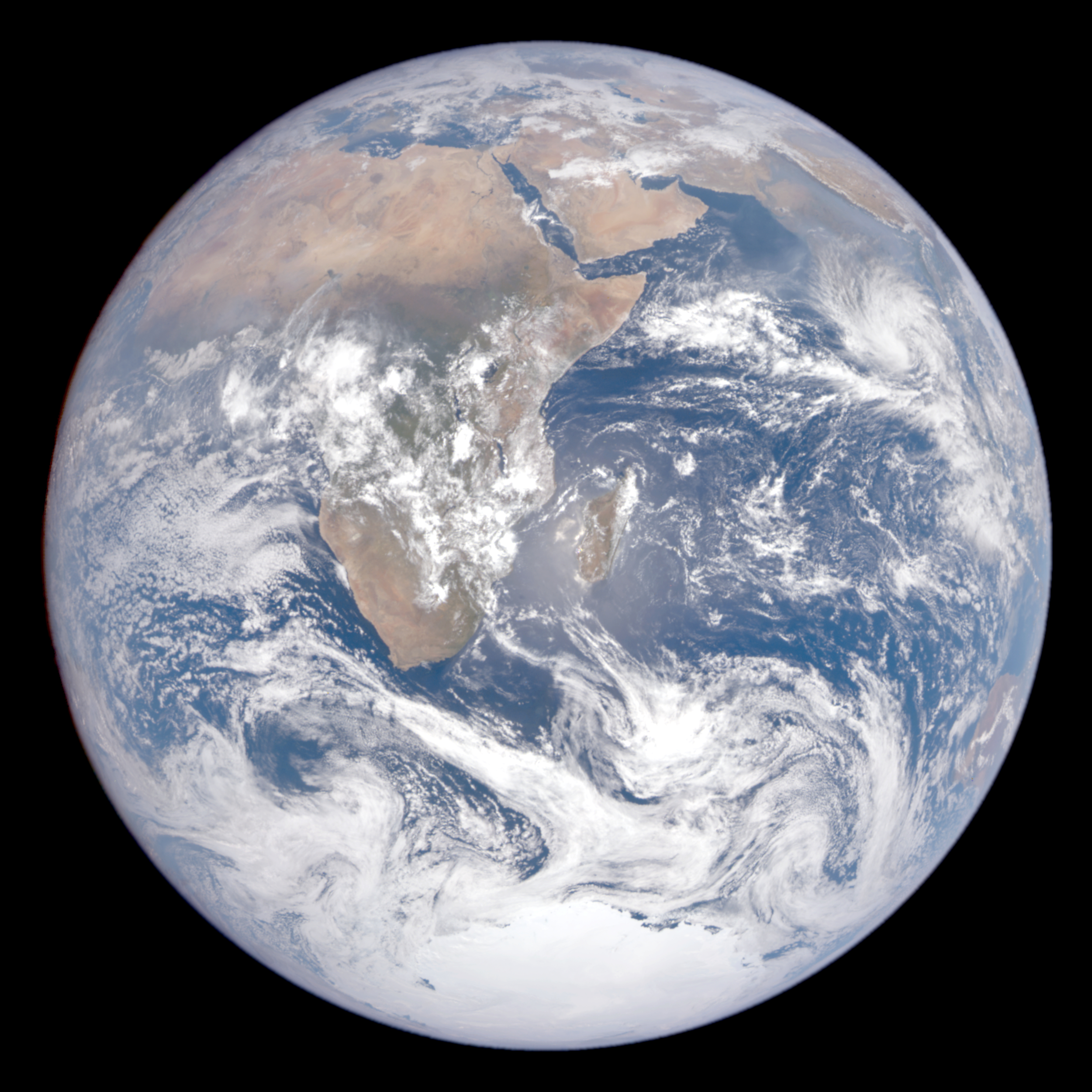
A color-corrected image of the Earth taken by the DSCOVR satellite on December 7, 2022, as one of a series of photos taken for The Blue Marble's 50th anniversary.

In 2022, NASA released a series of anniversary images of The Blue Marble taken by DSCOVR, 50 years after the original, over the same area of Earth.

The half-century shows in the environmental change, with less Antarctic ice and the Sahara being larger.

=== Hello, World ===
Hello, World, taken in 2026 by Reid Wiseman, commander of the Artemis II near-Moon mission.

In April 2026, Artemis II commander Reid Wiseman took a photo of the Earth from the Orion Integrity spacecraft's window while traveling toward the Moon for a lunar flyby. NASA's caption for the image notes that two auroras are visible and that zodiacal light can be seen as the Earth eclipses the Sun. This photo was titled Hello, World. Like the original, unrotated version of The Blue Marble, this photo was taken with the South Pole facing upwards. Hello, World and a preceding lower-exposure snapshot from the same perspective are the first images of the full Earth disk taken by a person since The Blue Marble.

The image metadata indicates that it was taken using a Nikon D5 camera with a 14–24 mm f/2.8 lens at an aperture of f/4, an exposure time of 1/4 second, and an ISO setting of 51,200; the exposure was set manually and the image was later processed using Adobe Photoshop Lightroom Classic.

== Critique ==
The Blue Marble, and other images from space, have been in parts critically analyzed as a "god trick" or high-modern expert view, producing a kind of control over how Earth is seen and how it is not seen, distracting from human geographic issues and from being a technological product produced by a dominant spacefaring country, which developed the image and its overview effect as a boundless worldview instead of as an image inviting an intricate and critical overview.

Similarly it has been argued by social scientists, among them Bruno Latour, that it is a continuation of viewing the world as something distant instead of something acutely present, like understanding the planet through the concept of the critical zone. In that regard the image is analyzed as a symbol of environmentalism that dismisses the environmentalist critique of spaceflight, particularly of the time of the Blue Marble.

While an important symbol for environmentalism, it has been pointed out by Neil M. Maher that it distracts from the reality and inequality of life on Earth and its environment as the disregarded shared and connecting dimension.

== See also ==
- List of photographs considered the most important
- Earthrise, another widely reproduced picture of the Earth, taken in 1968 by Bill Anders aboard Apollo 8
- Pale Blue Dot, a 1990 image of the Earth taken by Voyager 1
- The Day the Earth Smiled, a 2013 image of the Earth taken by Cassini
- Hello, World, a 2026 photograph of the Earth by Reid Wiseman aboard Artemis II
- Earthset, another 2026 photograph of Earth by Christina Koch, also aboard Artemis II, similar to Earthrise
- Pale Orange Dot, a NASA digital model showing a possible early Earth
- DODGE, satellite which took the first color picture of the complete Earth disk
- Earth phases from the Moon
- First images of Earth from space
- Himawari 8 and 9, geostationary satellites that produce an image of the Earth's full face every 10 minutes in the daytime
- Stewart Brand § NASA images of Earth, author who lobbied NASA in 1966 to release a satellite photograph of the entire Earth because he thought it would be a powerful symbol
- Space selfie
- Whole Earth Catalog, an eclectic catalog compiled by Brand which was inspired in part by photographs of the Earth as a globe
