= Steven Cravis =

- Born: Lexington Massachusetts
- Genre: New Age Music
- Occupations: Pianist, composer, music producer
- Instrument: Piano
- Years active: 1992–present
- Website: https://www.stevencravis.com/

Steven Cravis (born, Lexington, Massachusetts), is a pianist, composer and music producer based in San Francisco, California, who scores for video games, television, film and ringtones as well as releasing new age music with a focus on meditation and relaxation.

== Early life ==
Cravis began taking piano lessons at the age of seven and was influenced as a teenager by the music of George Winston. After high school he studied piano performance at the University of Bridgeport in Connecticut and then the Berklee College of Music in Boston before moving to California. In a 2011 interview, he stated the importance of his meditation practice on his creative and professional development

== Career ==
Cravis released his first solo piano work in 1992 called True Reflections and his second The Sound of Light in 1995.

In 2000, Cravis met American solo piano composer and a pianist David Nevue and went on to become one of the first of 237 artists featured in David Nevue’s Whispering Radio Station.

In 2004 he released the album Lavender Dreams followed by in Healing Piano in 2009.

Between 2001 and 2010, Cravis composed music for several video games designed by Ferry Halim, including 2003 World Summit Award winner Orisinal: Morning Sunshine.

In 2010, Cravis was hired to produce the music for the award-winning Quell (video game) app.

In 2016 he released the album Cloudwalker.

His works include for the award-winning Quell (video game) app, Orisinal, Animal Planet, CBS, CNN, NBC, and Matchroom Sport|UK.

In 2017 he provided the score for the TV documentary Going the Distance: Journeys of Recovery, about survivors of traumatic brain injury.

In 2022, he released the album Felt Piano for Anxiety exclusively through the Calm app.

== Discography ==
- True Reflections (1992)
- The Sound of Light (1995)
- Lavender Dreams (2004)
- Healing Piano (2009)
- Cloudwalker (2016)
- Felt Piano for Anxiety (2022).
