= Robert Simmon =

Planet Senior Data Visualization Engineer

- Years active: 2012-present

Robert Simmon is a Senior Data Visualization Engineer at Planet Labs, a commercial Earth observation company in San Francisco. Prior to moving in 2014, he was employed as a Senior Program Analyst at Goddard Space Flight Center where he was affiliated with the Climate and Radiation Laboratory and the NASA Earth Observatory. While serving as a Lead Data Visualizer and Information Designer at this division of NASA, Simmon is most notable for his visualization of the Western Hemisphere of Earth. Well known as the Blue Marble 2002, this image that would become the default wallpaper on the first iPhone in 2007. Furthermore, in Simmon's field of information visualization, through his work with NASA, he strove to "help people better understand how the Earth works."

== Blue Marble 2002 ==
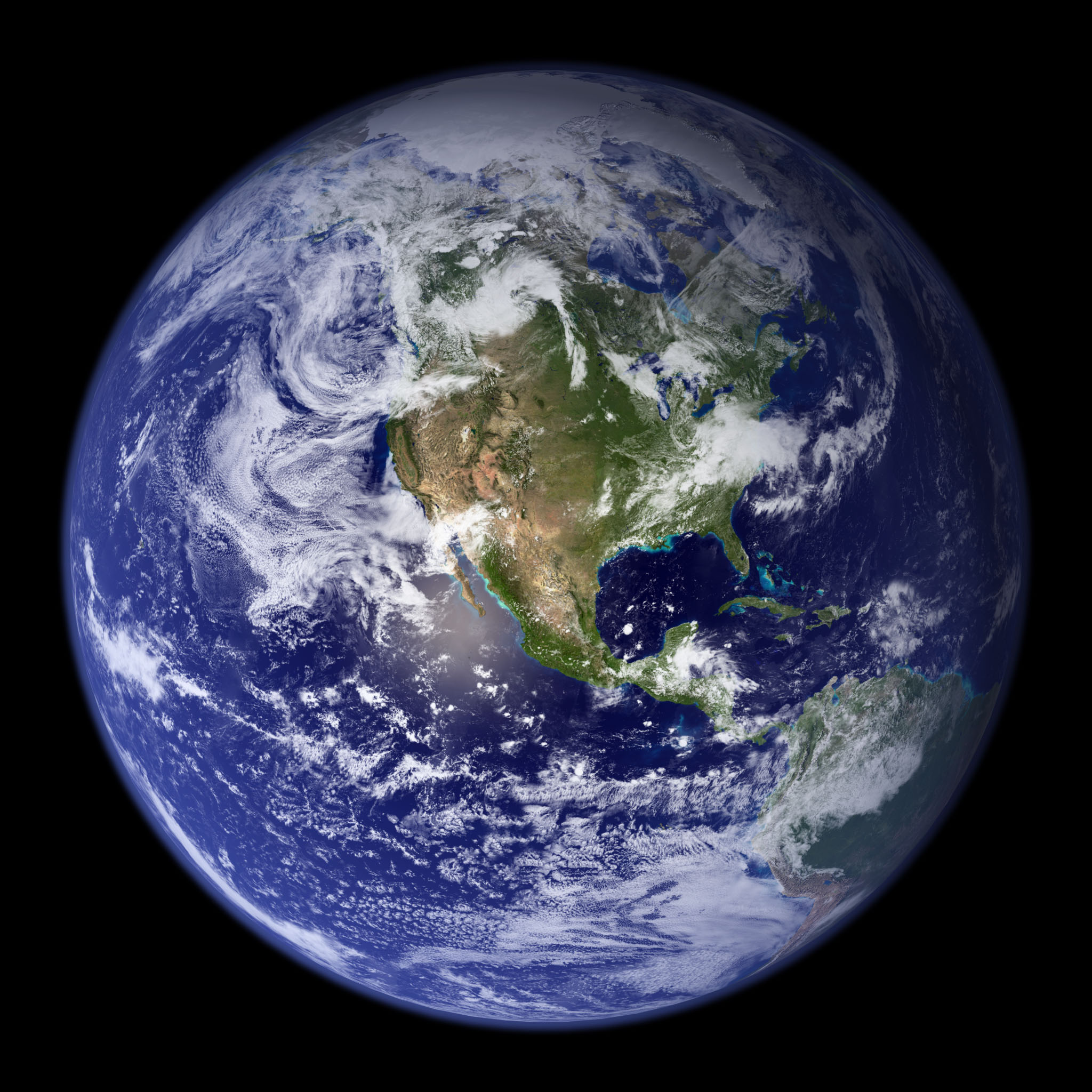
One of the results Simmon generated, which was used as one of the default wallpapers for the first-generation iPhone in 2007.

Originally produced in 2002 and then later finding its place as the wallpaper for the original iPhone in 2007, Simmon was able to use a series of light data, collected from NASA's Terra satellite in order to construct the final result. Gathering data over the course of 4 months, as the satellite spun around its path, light data could be gathered from pole to pole of the surface below. Once the entirety of the surface data was collected, layers such as Specular Maps and Color Maps were able to be extracted and utilized to generate the representation of the Earth. Afterwards, the final images would be digitally composited together and applied to the surface of a computer generated sphere and composited together in Photoshop in order to render the final result.

Due to the nature of the data collection process, a part of Simmon's responsibility would to be conceal any holes left by the satellites imaging. To accomplish this, areas around missing patches left in the cloud layers required additional touch-ups in Photoshop. Likewise, elements such as the atmosphere halo could not be collected from the satellite data and thereby had to be generated completely in Photoshop.
