= David Nevue =

American solo piano composer and pianist (born 1965)

- Born: 1965 (age 60–61); North Bend, Oregon, U.S.
- Genre: Piano
- Instrument: Piano
- Years active: 1991–present
- Label: Midnight Rain Productions
- Website: www.davidnevue.com

David Nevue (born 1965) is an American solo piano composer and a pianist. He is the founder of online radio station "Whisperings: Solo Piano Radio".

== Online radio work ==
Nevue established the "Whisperings: Solo Piano Radio" internet radio station in August 2003 as a vehicle for promoting his own particular brand of piano music. Believing that the days of the traditional music industry were numbered, he decided to bypass the process of sending demos to record labels, and to use the web to promote his music on his own. Nevue began promoting his music online in 1995, and by 2001, he was able to make music his full-time career.

Whisperings started out as part of the Live365.com family of independent online radio stations, but eventually grew beyond just Live365.com. Most listeners now tune in via the Whisperings web site, iTunes radio or Windows Media Tuner. Whisperings radio is supported by paid subscriptions from listeners who prefer commercial-free broadcasts. 273 artists are featured on the broadcast, including Joe Yamada, David Lanz, David Nevue, Josh Winiberg, Peter Kater, Michael Dulin, Wayne Gratz, Isadar, Louis Landon, Robin Spielberg, Steven Cravis and Suzanne Ciani.

Nevue also founded The Music Biz Academy, an educational website for independent musicians, and is the author of the book, How to Promote Your Music Successfully on the Internet.

== Discography ==
- 1992 The Tower
- 1995 While the Trees Sleep
- 1997 The Last Waking Moment
- 1999 The Vigil
- 2001 Whisperings: The Best of David Nevue
- 2001 Postcards from Germany
- 2003 O Come Emmanuel
- 2004 Sweet Dreams & Starlight
- 2005 Overcome
- 2007 Adoration: Solo Piano Hymns
- 2009 Revelation: Solo Piano for Prayer & Worship
- 2011 A Delicate Joy
- 2012 Awakenings: The Best of David Nevue (2001-2010)
- 2013 Open Sky
- 2015 Winding Down
- 2019 In the Soft Light of Grace
- 2026 Restoration: Hymns for Solo Piano
