= Quell (wearable) =

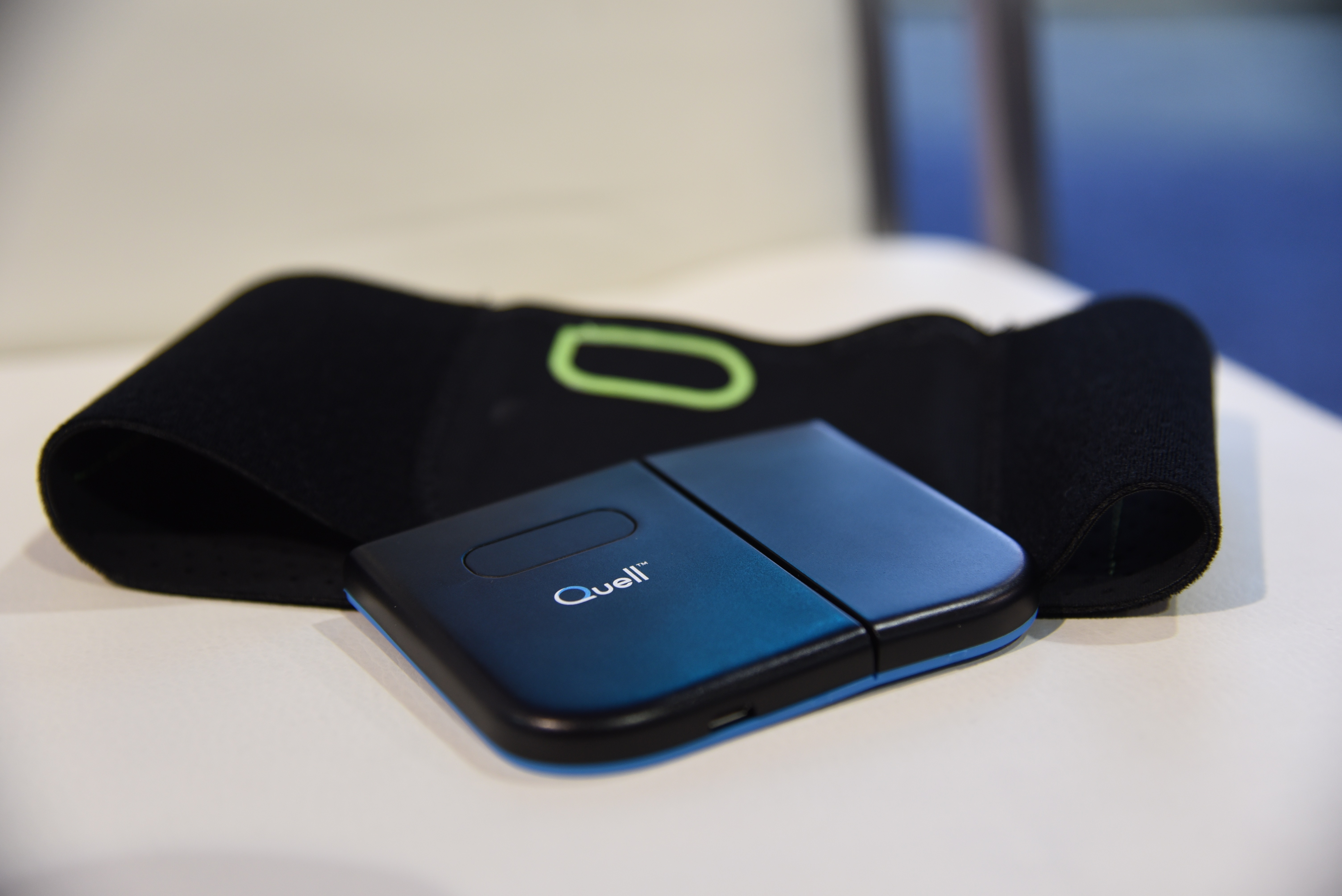
The Quell wearable device

Quell is a wearable device, manufactured by Neurometrix, that claims to offer relief from chronic pain without the use of drugs. Quell is an FDA approved band worn on the calf and uses Transcutaneous Electrical Nerve Stimulation (TENS) technology. Neurometrix reference a small study, funded by the company, to claim efficacy in chronic pain; however, evidence is currently limited
