= Quell (video game) =

2010 video game

- Developer(s): Fallen Tree Games
- Publisher(s): Fallen Tree Games; Green Man Gaming; BulkyPix; CIRCLE Entertainment
- Platform(s): iOS, Android, Windows, Nintendo Switch
- Release: August 7, 2010
- Genre(s): Puzzle
- Mode(s): Single-player

Quell is a 2010 puzzle game created by British studio Fallen Tree Games and released on August 7, 2010, for iOS and Android.

== Gameplay ==
Players control a raindrop by swiping their finger in directions. The raindrop moves until it hits a wall. The raindrop must touch every golden ball without getting stuck or hitting spikes.

Additional puzzle elements such as switches, blocks, and gates introduce more complexity during gameplay.

== Reception ==
Reception

Aggregate score
Aggregator	Score
Metacritic	84/100

Review scores
Publication	Score
Eurogamer	8/10
AppSpy	Good
Slide to Play	Good

The game has a "generally favorable" Metacritic score of 84 based on four critic reviews.

AppSpy said "Quell is a beautifully relaxing puzzle title to delve in to and even when things get rough it's easy to get lost in the moment and just play for the sake of chilling out". Eurogamer wrote "At less than the price that airports charge for a packet of Extra, Quell is yet another way to make you feel Zen about spending hundreds of pounds on Apple hardware". Slide to Play said "Quell is a simple puzzle game that you won't want to quit".

== Sequels ==
Developer Fallen Tree Games released multiple sequels:

- Quell Reflect was announced and released on August 19, 2011, for iOS, and later on Android, Nintendo 3DS, and Steam.
- Quell Memento was released in April 2013 for iOS, and later for Android, Nintendo 3DS, PS VITA, and Steam. This sequel introduced additional puzzle elements such as light panels, batteries, colored beams, roses, hidden timekeeper levels.
- Quell Zen was announced and released in July 2016 for iOS, Android, and Steam. This sequel introduced additional puzzle elements such as matching symbol tiles, poisoned pearls, and hidden Zen and Black Hole levels.
