= NASA Earth Observatory =

Online publication of NASA

Logo of the NASA Earth Observatory

The NASA Earth Observatory is an online publishing outlet for NASA which was created in 1999. It is the principal source of satellite imagery and other scientific information about the climate and the environment which are being provided by NASA for consumption by the general public. It is funded with public money, as authorized by the United States Congress, and is part of the EOS Project Science Office located at the Goddard Space Flight Center.

As of 2006, NASA Earth Observatory has won the Webby People's Voice Award in Education three times. There were a series of publicized images issued by the website in 2008, including imagery of clouds streaming over the Caspian Sea, dust storms curling off the coast of Morocco, the crumbling of the Wilkins Ice Shelf, Hurricane Bertha, and others.

== See also ==
- Earth observation
- Earth observation satellite
- Space exploration
