= Debus (crater) =

Crater on the Moon

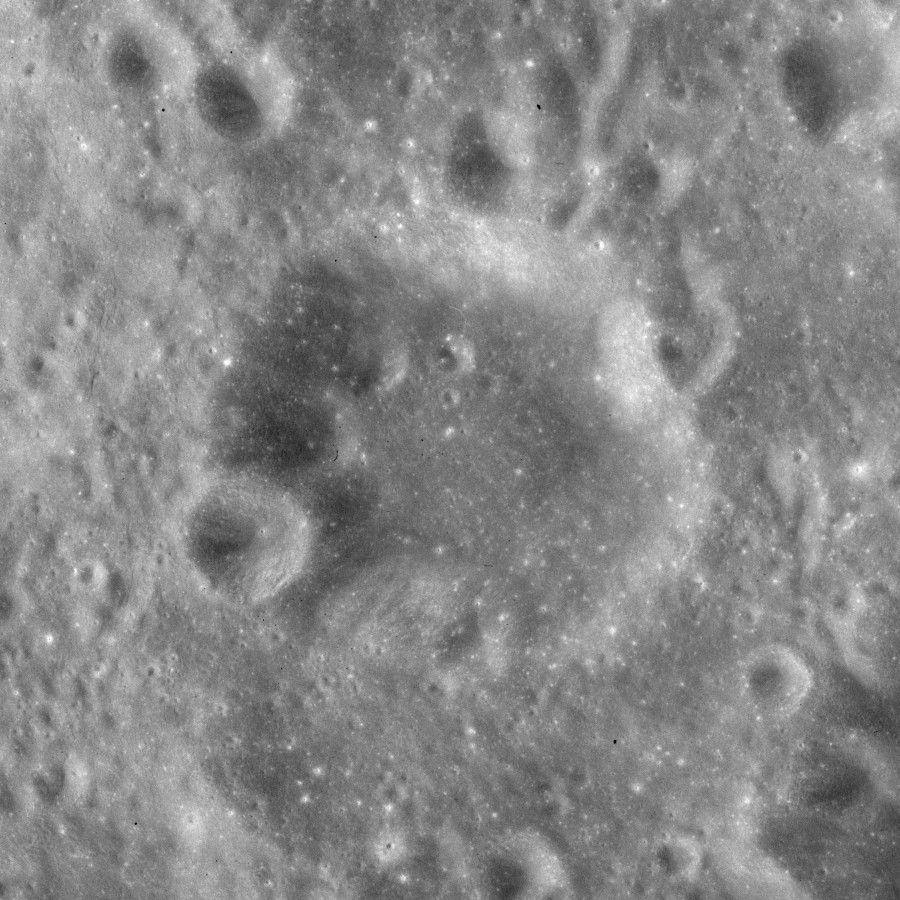
- Apollo 15 Mapping Camera image
- Coordinates: 10.5°S 99.6°E
- Diameter: 19.77 km (12.28 mi)
- Depth: Unknown
- Colongitude: 261° at sunrise
- Eponym: Kurt H. Debus

Debus is a small lunar impact crater that is located on the far side of the Moon, past the eastern limb. It lies to the east-southeast of the crater Ganskiy, and just to the west of a huge walled plain named Pasteur.

This is a circular crater with a bowl-shaped appearance. The rim is worn, and several tiny craterlets lie along the edge. The interior floor is relatively level and nearly featureless.

This formation is named in honor of German engineer, NAZI officer, and former Kennedy Space Center director Kurt H. Debus (1908-1983). Its designation was formally adopted by the IAU in 2000. Previously, it was identified as Ganskiy H, a satellite feature of Ganskiy.
