= 8 Homeward =

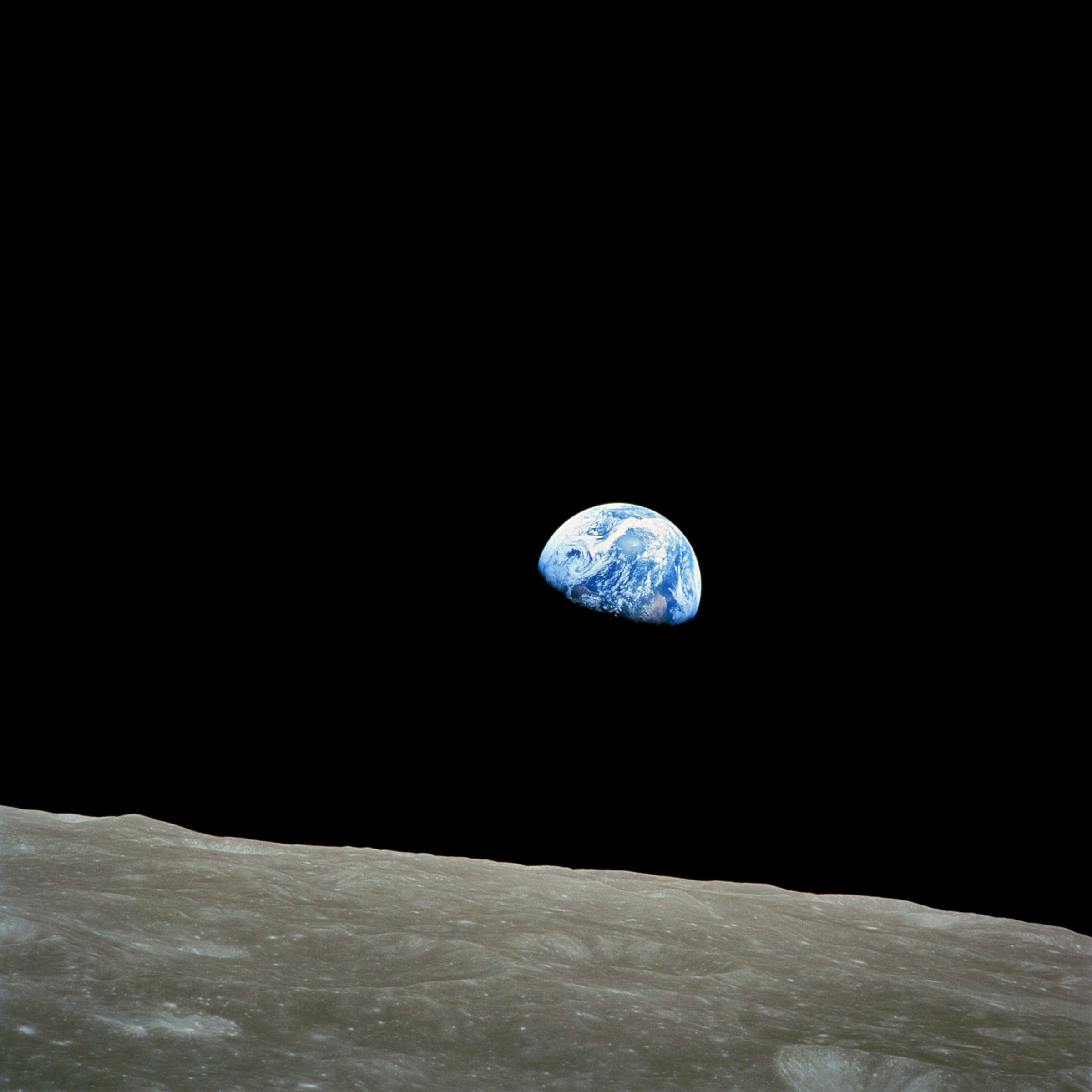
- The Earthrise photograph (AS08-14-2383); 8 Homeward crater is near the left horizon
- Coordinates: 12.02°S 97.09°E
- Diameter: 12.52
- Depth: Unknown
- Eponym: Crater visible in the iconic Earthrise color photograph

8 Homeward is a lunar impact crater that is located on the southern hemisphere on the far side of the Moon. It is visible in the left horizon of the famous Earthrise photograph (AS08-14-2383) taken by astronaut William Anders on the Apollo 8 mission to the Moon in 1968. The crater's name was approved by the IAU on 5 October 2018. The crater Anders' Earthrise, also visible in the Earthrise photograph, was named at the same time.

8 Homeward was previously designated Ganskiy M. It lies west of the crater Pasteur and south of Ganskiy.

== Gallery ==
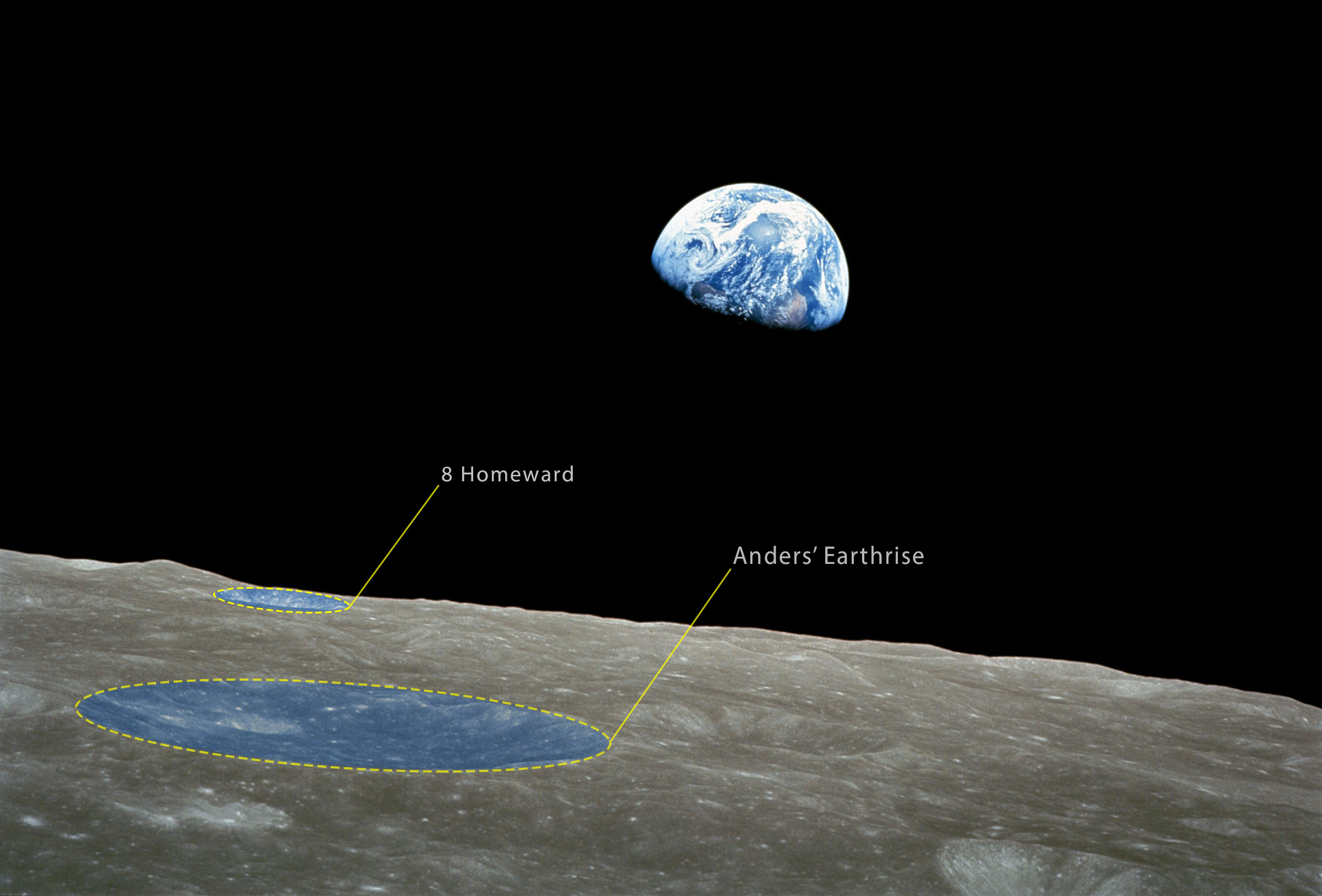
Annotated version

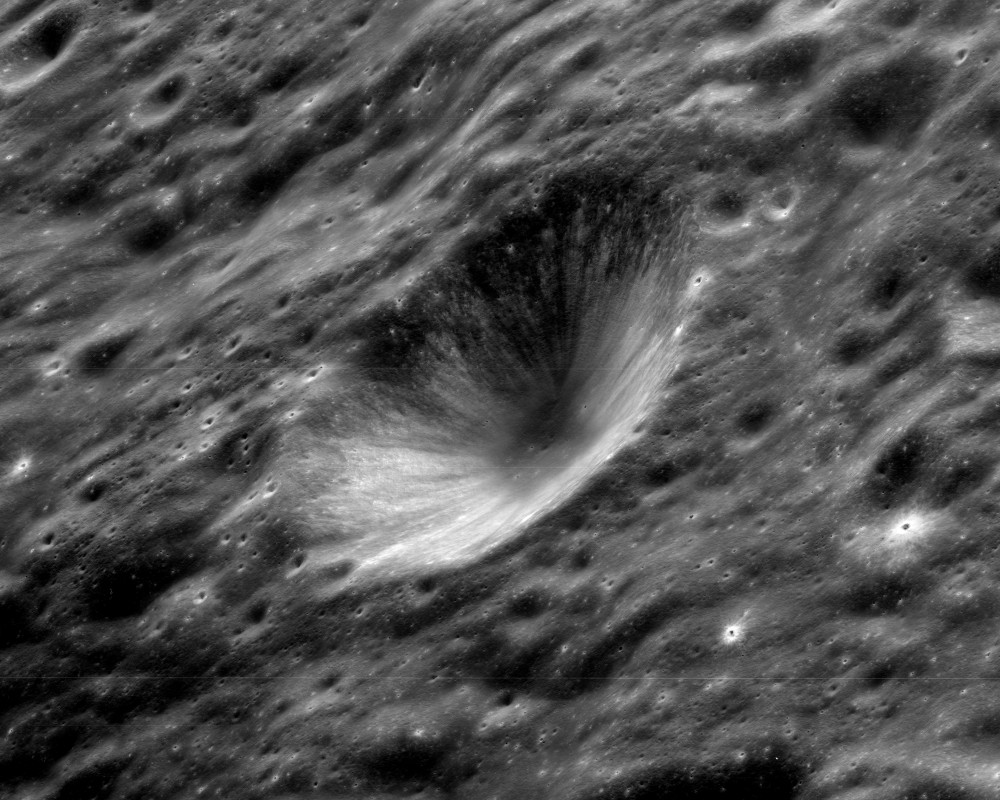
Oblique view of 8 Homeward crater from Apollo 17 panoramic camera
