= Kurt Debus =

German-American rocket engineer and scientist (1908–1983)

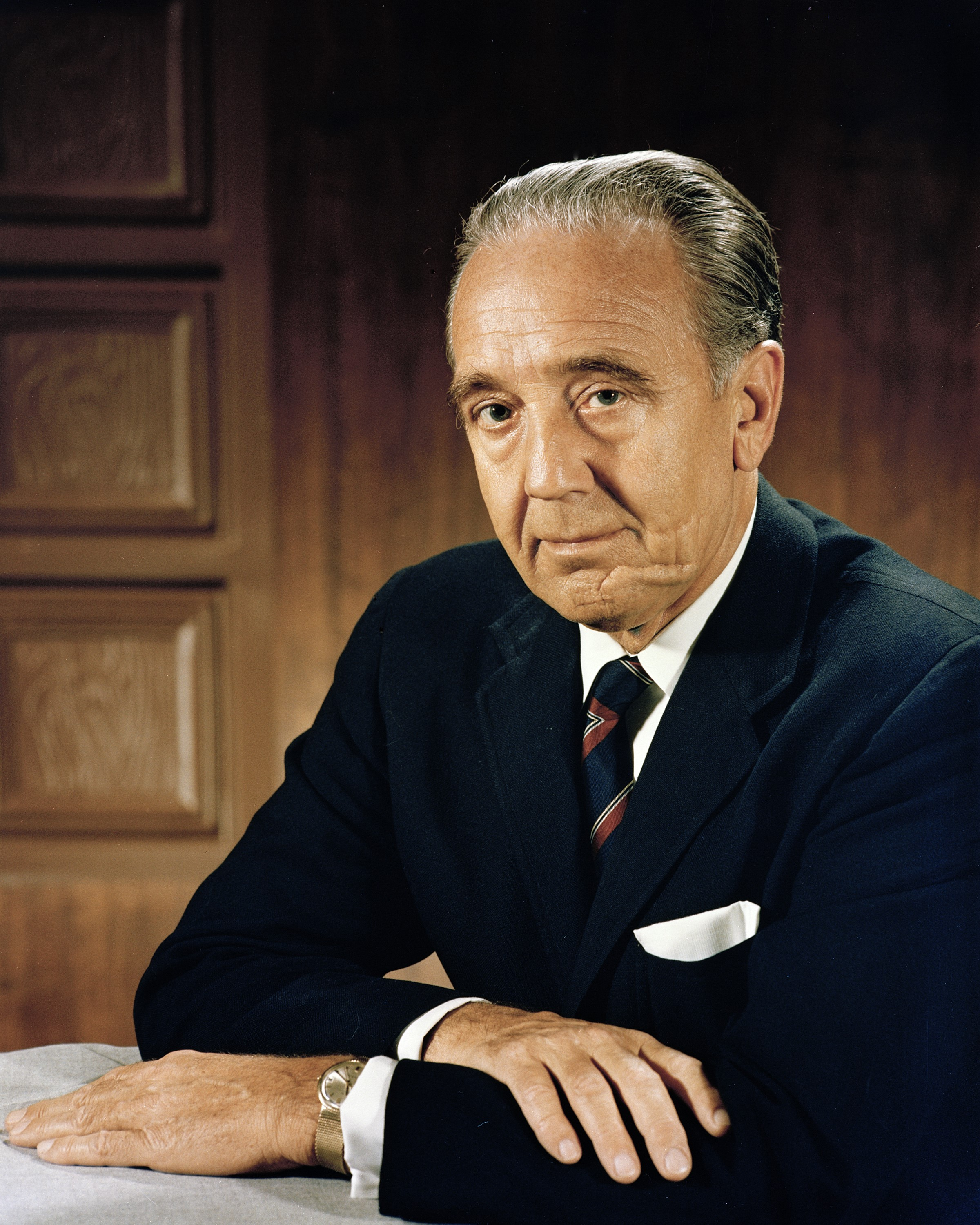
- Official NASA portrait, 1970
- Born: Kurt Heinrich Debus; November 29, 1908; Frankfurt, German Empire
- Died: October 10, 1983 (aged 74); Rockledge, Florida, U.S.
- Education: Technische Hochschule Darmstadt
- Known for: First director of Kennedy Space Center
- Spouse: Irmgard Brueckmann (m. 1937)
- Children: 2
- Scientific career
- Fields: Electrical engineering
- Workplaces: Voight & Haeffner, AG (Frankfurt) 1939–1943: Technische Hochschule Darmstadt (assistant professor); 1943–1945: Peenemünde; 1945–1950: White Sands Proving Grounds; 1950–1952: Redstone Arsenal; 1952–1960: ABMA at Cape Canaveral; 1962–1964: Launch Operations Center; 1964–1974: Kennedy Space Center 1974–1980: OTRAG (Chairman of the Board)

Kurt Heinrich Debus (November 29, 1908 – October 10, 1983) was a German-American rocket engineer and NASA director. Born in Germany, he was a member of the Schutzstaffel (SS) during World War II, where he served as a V-weapons flight test director. Following the war, he was brought to the United States via Operation Paperclip, and directed the design, development, construction and operation of NASA's Saturn launch facilities. He became the first director of NASA's Launch Operations Center (later renamed as the Kennedy Space Center), and, under him, NASA conducted 150 launches of military missiles and space vehicles, including 13 launches of the Saturn V rocket as part of the Apollo Moon landing program.

== Biography ==
=== Germany ===
Born to Melly F. (née Grauchlich) and Heinrich P. J. Debus in Frankfurt, German Empire, in 1908, Debus received all his academic education and credentials in Germany during the interwar period. He attended Technische Hochschule Darmstadt where he earned his initial and advanced degrees in electrical engineering. He served as a graduate assistant on the faculty for electrical engineering and high-voltage engineering while studying for his master's degree.

In 1939, he obtained his engineering doctorate with a thesis on surge voltages, and was appointed assistant professor at the university. During World War II, Debus was a member of the Nazi Party, and joined the SA in 1933 and the SS in 1940 [No 426.559].

Debus was appointed by Hitler as the V-weapons flight test director and was actively engaged in the rocket research program at Peenemünde and the development of the V-2 rocket, Debus led the Test Stand Group personnel at Peenemünde and was the engineer in charge at Test Stand VII.

At the end of the war, Debus and a small group of the V-2 engineers led by Wernher von Braun's brother sought out the advancing American 44th Infantry Division near Schattwald on May 2, 1945. Debus was detained by the U.S. Army with the rest of the Peenemünde scientists at Garmisch-Partenkirchen. Debus served as both a technical and diplomatic liaison between German rocket engineers and the British during Operation Backfire, a series of V-2 test launches from an abandoned German naval gun range near Cuxhaven, Germany, in October 1945.

=== United States ===
In late 1945, Debus was transferred to Fort Bliss, Texas, under contract as a "special employee" of the U.S. Army, as were the other German rocket specialists. He was brought to the United States as part of Operation Paperclip, a secret United States intelligence program in which more than 1,600 German scientists, engineers, and technicians were brought from former Nazi Germany to the U.S. for government employment after the end of World War II in Europe.

He was deputy director at the Guidance and Control Branch through December 1948, when he was promoted to assistant technical director to von Braun at the Redstone Arsenal in Huntsville, Alabama.

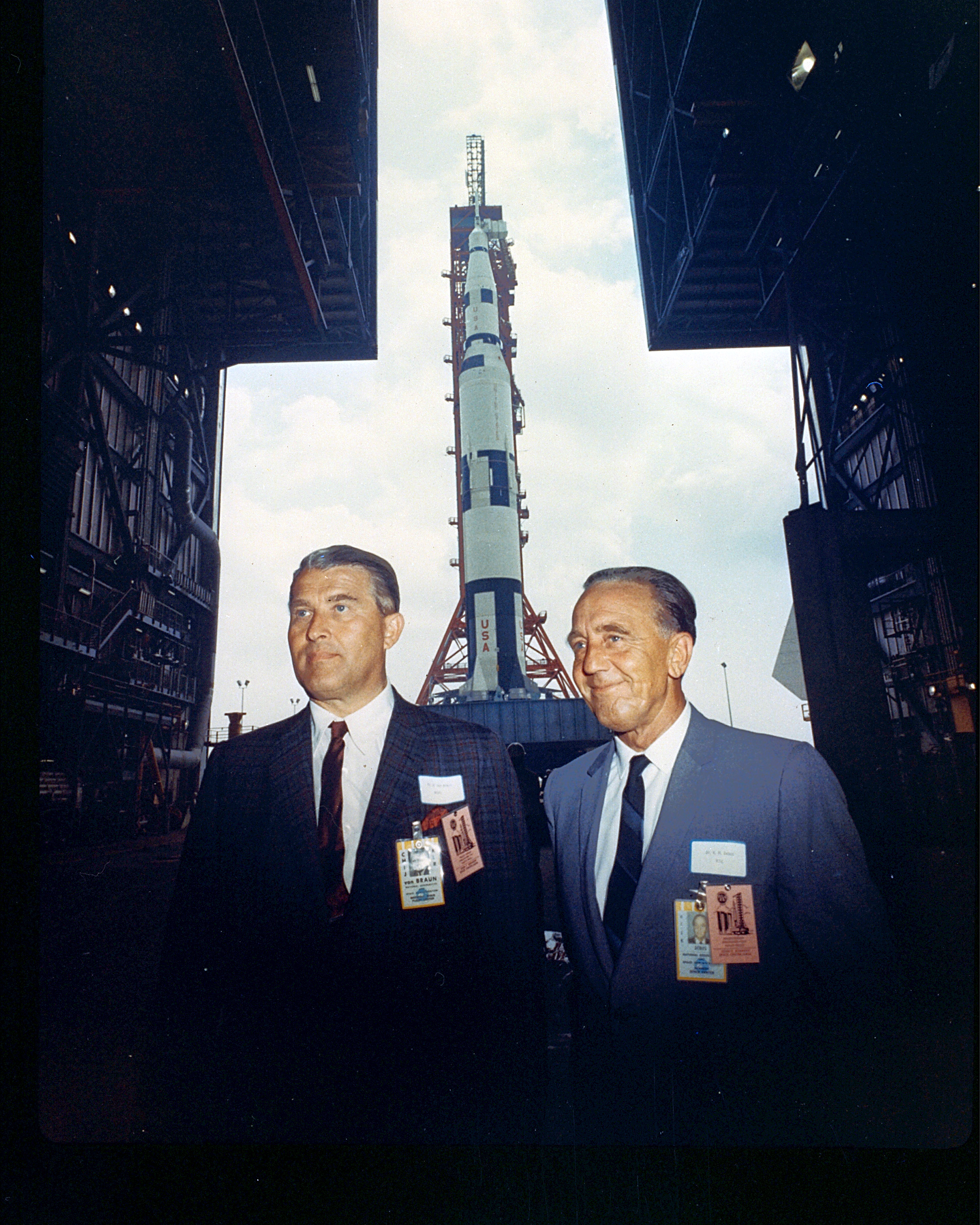
Debus (right) and Wernher von Braun at a Saturn V test vehicle rollout, 1966

The arsenal became the focal point of the Army's rocket and space projects; larger rockets were launched first from White Sands Missile Range in New Mexico, and later from Cape Canaveral. The Army assigned von Braun as chairman of a Development Board, and Debus supervised the development program of the Guided Missile Branch until November 1951. The Army Ordnance Department reorganized the team and called it the Ordnance Guided Missile Center. By November 1951, the pace had picked up and a new missile program, the Redstone, was taking shape. Von Braun named Debus to lead a new Experimental Missiles Firing Branch. Debus' organization also launched the first U.S. missiles carrying atomic warheads in the Pacific Ocean area during a series of tests.

Starting in 1952, Debus supervised the development and construction of rocket launch facilities at Cape Canaveral for the Redstone, Jupiter, Jupiter-C, Juno and Pershing military configurations continuing through 1960. The organization he directed was transferred from the Army to NASA.

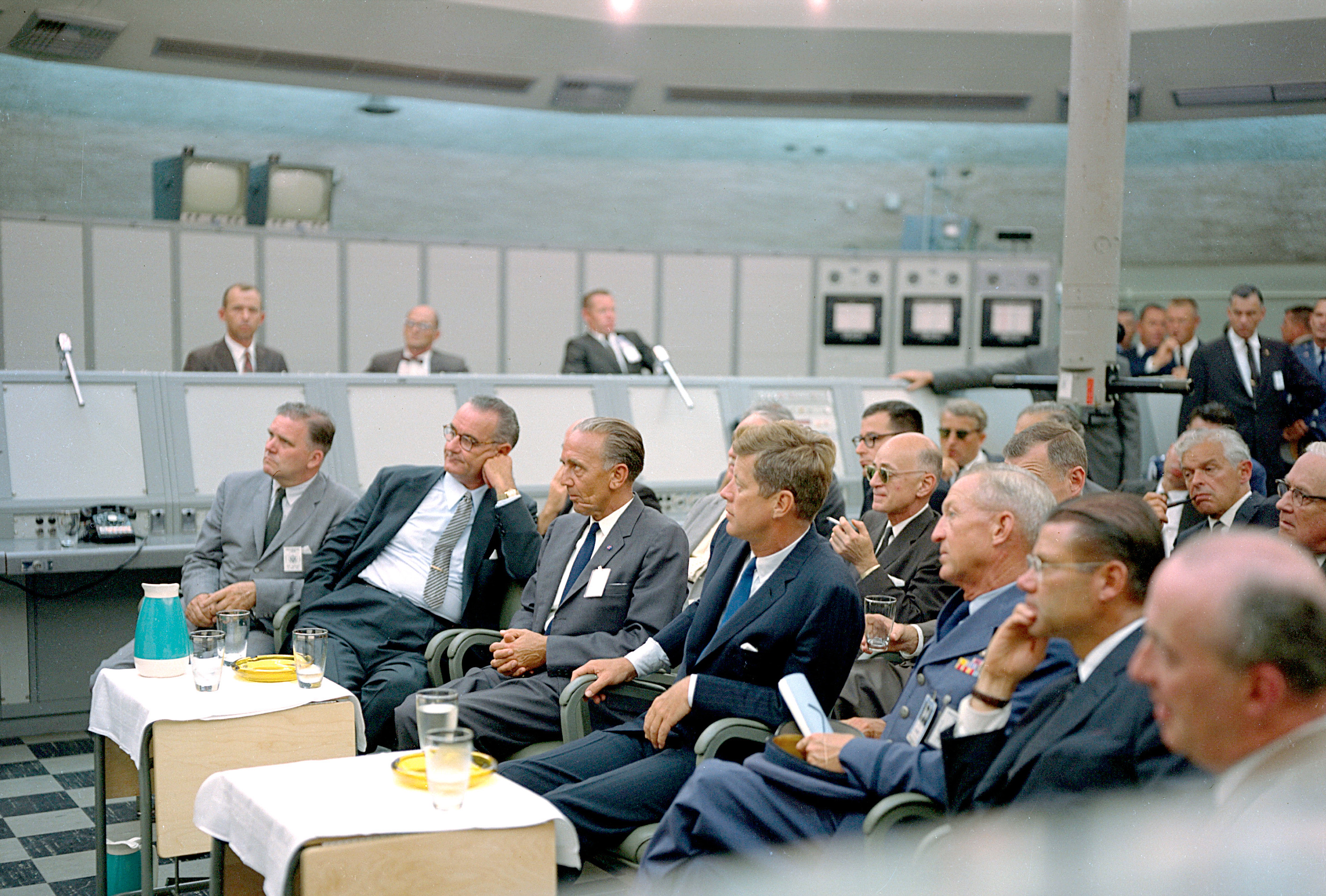
Debus sitting between US President John F. Kennedy and US Vice President Lyndon B. Johnson in 1962 at a briefing at Blockhouse 34, Cape Canaveral Missile Test Annex

Beginning in 1961, Debus directed the design, development and construction of NASA's Saturn launch facilities at the north end of Cape Canaveral and adjacent Merritt Island.

On July 1, 1962, the Florida launch facility at Cape Canaveral was officially designated as NASA's Launch Operations Center (renamed to honor President John Kennedy after his assassination in 1963) and Debus was officially named its first director. In October 1965, he became responsible for NASA uncrewed launch operations at the Eastern and Western Ranges, assuming the additional title of Kennedy Space Center (KSC) director of launch operations until Rocco Petrone took the post in 1966.

Under Debus' leadership, NASA and its team of contractors built what was hailed as the Free World's Moonport — KSC's Launch Complex 39 — as well as tested and launched the Saturn family of rockets for the Apollo and Skylab programs. Debus retired as KSC director in November 1974.

=== Family ===
Debus married Irmgard Brueckmann on June 30, 1937; they had two daughters while still in Germany: Siegrid and Ute (1940–2011).

== Recognition ==
A small lunar crater on the far side of the Moon to the east-southeast of the crater Ganskiy, past the eastern limb, is named for Debus; as is The Kurt Debus Conference Center at the Kennedy Space Center Visitor Complex. Debus was inducted into the National Space Hall of Fame in 1969. He was awarded an honorary Doctor of Law and Doctor of Engineering Science degrees by Rollins College in 1967 and Florida Technological University in 1969, respectively.

Since 1990, the National Space Club of Florida has presented its annual Debus Award to recognize significant aerospace achievements in Florida, including individuals associated with launch vehicles, spacecraft operations, ground support services, range activities, space education and spaceport research and development. The award was conceived as an adjunct to the Goddard Award given each year by the National Space Club in Washington, D.C. to an individual in the aerospace field on a national level.

== Awards ==
- 1965: Pioneer of Wind Rose Award, order of the Diamond (International Committee of Aerospace Activities)
- 1967: Space Flight Award (AAS)
- 1968: Outstanding Achievement Award (U.S. Treasury)
- 1969: National Space Hall of Fame
- 1969: NASA Distinguished Service Medal (twice: Apollo 8, 11)
- 1969: Patriotic Service Award (U.S. Treasury)
- 1969: Outstanding Leadership Award (NASA)
- 1969: Exceptional Civilian Medal (U.S. Army)
- 1969: Career Service Award (National Civil Service Reform League)
- 1969: Americanism Medal (DAR)
- 1971: AIAA fellow
- 1971: Commander's Cross of the order of merit (FRG)
- 1971: Hermann-Oberth Gesellschaft Honor Ring
- 1971: Scott Gold Medal
- 1974: Louis W. Hill Space Transportation Award (AIAA)

=== Memberships ===
- Schutzstaffel (SS)
- Instrument Society of America (honorary)
- Hermann-Raketentechnik and Raumfahrt, e.V. (honorary)
- Marquis Biographical Library Society (advisory)
- Member of the Florida Council of 100 (ex officio)
- British Interplanetary Society (Advisory Board)
- American Ordnance Association (life)

== Sources ==
- Debus, Kurt (June 25, 1964). Some Design Problems Encountered in Construction of Launch Complex 39. Darmstadt. Archived from the original on September 11, 2008.
