= Backlund (crater) =

Crater on the Moon

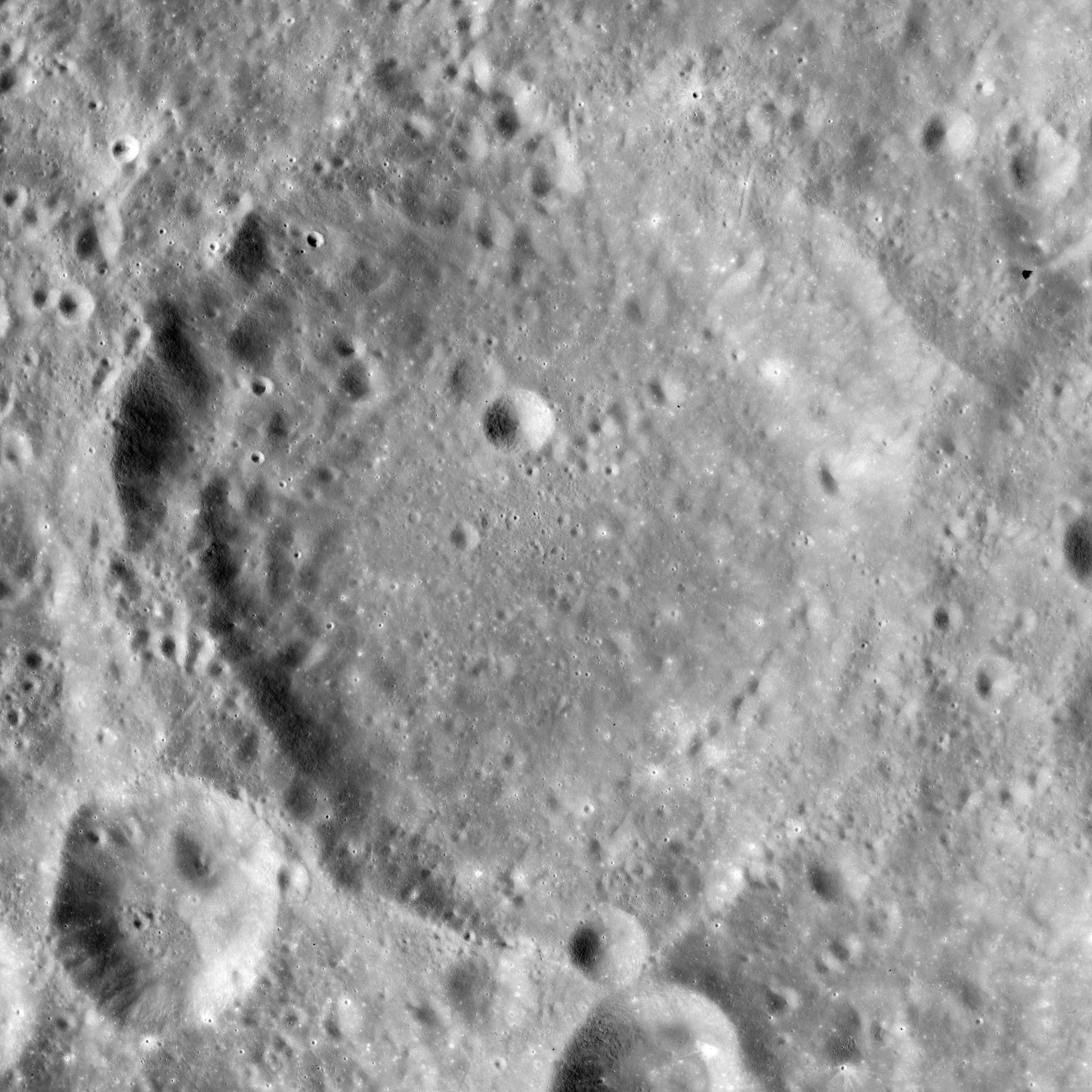
- Apollo 15 image
- Coordinates: 16.0°S 103.0°E
- Diameter: 75.46 km (46.89 mi)
- Depth: Unknown
- Colongitude: 254° at sunrise
- Eponym: Oskar Backlund

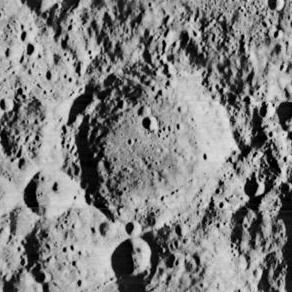
Lunar Orbiter 2 image

Backlund is a degraded lunar impact crater on the far side of the Moon. It lies beyond the eastern limb, astride the southern rim of the walled plain designated Pasteur, and to the west of the crater Hilbert. Further to the west-southwest is Sklodowska.

The north and south ends of this crater are more worn and eroded than the intervening stretches. Its interior floor is relatively flat, with the usual accompaniment of tiny impact craters marking the surface. The slightly darkened floor surface suggests it may include cryptomare. The floor displays a geochemical anomaly in the form of low abundances of aluminium and magnesium.

The name "Backlund" honours the Swedish-born Russian astronomer Oskar Andreevich Baklund (Russian: Оскар Андреевич Баклунд, 1846-1916). Its designation was formally adopted by the International Astronomical Union in 1970.

== Satellite craters ==
By convention these features are identified on lunar maps by placing the letter on the side of the crater midpoint that is closest to Backlund.

Backlund	Latitude	Longitude	Diameter
E	15.5° S	105.3° E	15 km
L	18.2° S	103.5° E	56 km
N	17.8° S	102.8° E	18 km
P	18.9° S	102.0° E	27 km
R	16.8° S	101.5° E	23 km
S	16.8° S	100.6° E	21 km

== See also ==
- Asteroid 856 Backlunda
