= Harold Alden =

American astronomer

Harold Lee Alden (January 10, 1890 – February 3, 1964) was an American astronomer.

== Early years and education ==
Alden was born in Chicago, Illinois. He received his Bachelor of Arts from Wheaton College (Illinois) in 1912 and his master's from the University of Chicago in 1913. From 1912 to 1913 he was an assistant in the photographic photometry program at the Yerkes Observatory. He received his Ph.D. in 1917 from the University of Virginia.

== Professional life ==
He worked for twenty years at the Yale Observatory in South Africa before returning to the University of Virginia. He is noted mainly for measuring stellar parallax, the proper motion of stars and long period variable stars. He returned to the University of Virginia in 1945 to become a Professor of Astronomy, chairman of the Astronomy Department and Director of the Leander McCormick Observatory. In 1951 he was the vice-president of the American Association for the Advancement of Science and chairman of its section D (astronomy). Then, from 1952 to 1955 he was the president of Commission 24, the Stellar Parallaxes section, of the International Astronomical Union.

== Later years ==
Alden retired from the University of Virginia on June 30, 1960. When he retired, he was made a Professor Emeritus in recognition for his 26 years at the university as a fellow, instructor, assistant, associate and full professor. He died in Charlottesville on February 3, 1964, and was survived by his wife, Mildred, by three children and by eleven grandchildren.

The crater Alden on the far side of the Moon is named in his honor.

== See also ==
- List of Wheaton College (Illinois) alumni
