= Alden (crater) =

Crater on the Moon

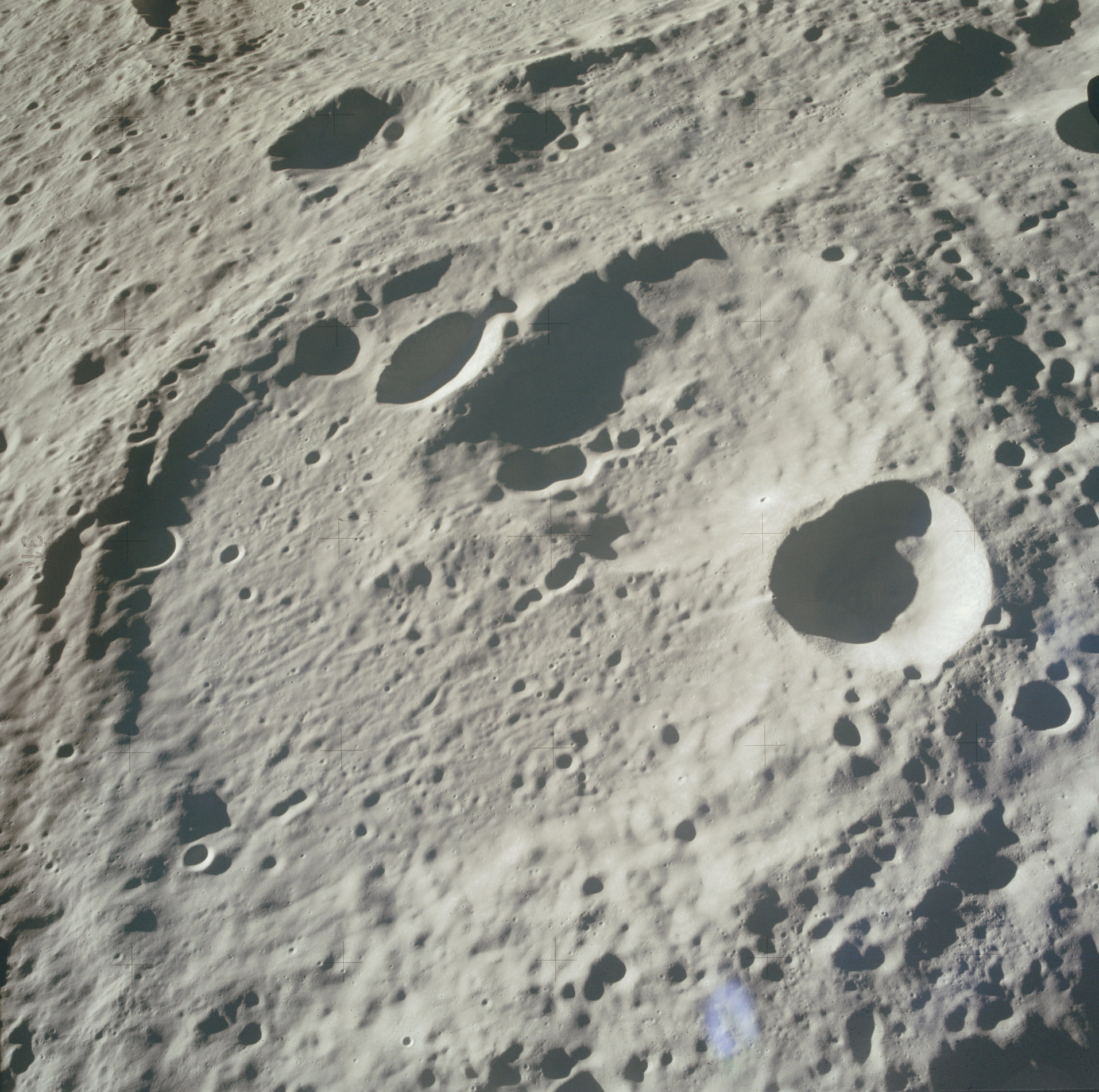
- Lunar crater Alden from Apollo 15. NASA image.
- Coordinates: 23.6°S 110.8°E
- Diameter: 111.44 km
- Depth: Unknown
- Colongitude: 250° at sunrise
- Formation: Early Imbrian
- Eponym: Harold Alden

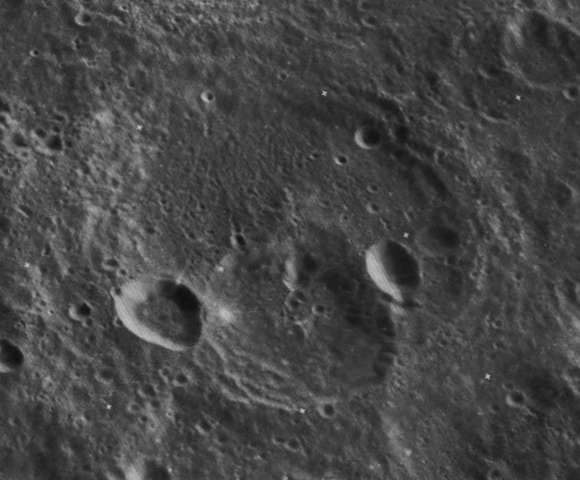
Lunar Orbiter 3 image, facing southeast

Alden is a lunar impact crater that lies on the far side of the Moon, between Hilbert to the north-northwest and Milne to the south-southeast. To the south-southwest lies Scaliger.

This formation dates from the Early Imbrian period on the lunar geologic timescale. Alden has a low rim that is overlain in the north and northeast by Alden C and the smaller Alden E. The rim is worn and eroded, especially along the southern wall. The floor is somewhat irregular and pitted. The small crater Alden V lies just inside the north rim, and is attached to Alden C to the east.

This crater is named after American astronomer Harold Alden (1890–1964). Its designation was formally adopted by the International Astronomical Union in 1970. During the planning for the Apollo 8 mission that circled the Moon, this crater was informally referred to as 'See'.

== Satellite craters ==
By convention these features are identified on lunar maps by placing the letter on the side of the crater midpoint that is closest to Alden.

Alden	Latitude	Longitude	Diameter
B	20.5° S	112.6° E	17 km
C	22.5° S	111.4° E	50 km
E	23.2° S	112.4° E	28 km
V	22.5° S	110.1° E	19 km
