= Anders' Earthrise =

Lunar crater

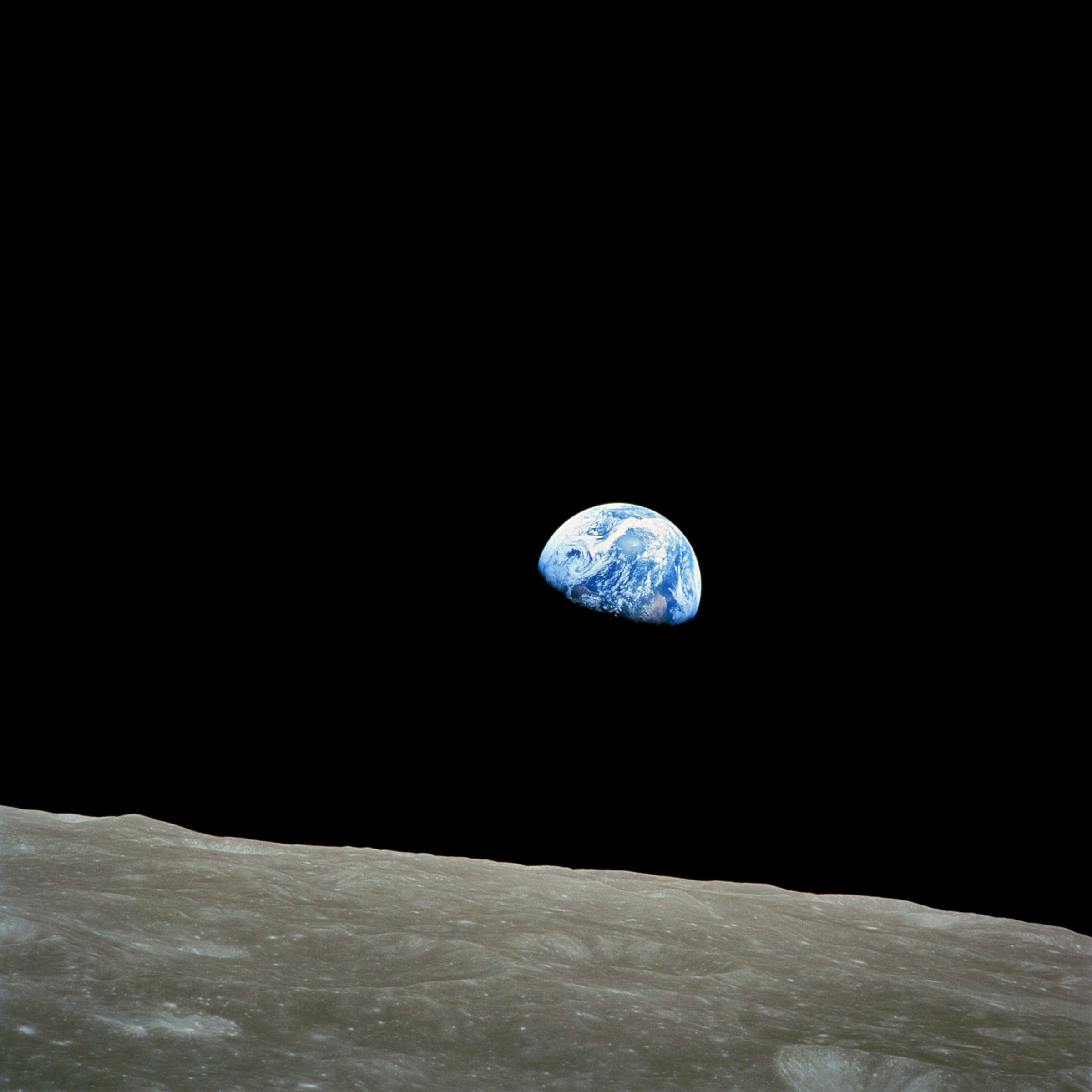
- The Earthrise photograph (AS08-14-2383); Anders' Earthrise crater is in the left foreground
- Coordinates: 11.73°S 100.47°E
- Diameter: 40.15 km
- Depth: Unknown
- Eponym: Crater visible in the foreground of the iconic Earthrise color photograph

Anders' Earthrise is a lunar impact crater that is located on the southern hemisphere on the far side of the Moon. It is visible in the foreground of the famous Earthrise photograph (AS08-14-2383) taken by astronaut William Anders on the Apollo 8 mission to the Moon in 1968. The crater's designation was approved by the IAU on 5 October 2018. The crater 8 Homeward, also visible in the Earthrise photograph, was named at the same time.

It lies on the west side of the crater Pasteur, and was formerly named Pasteur T.

== Gallery ==
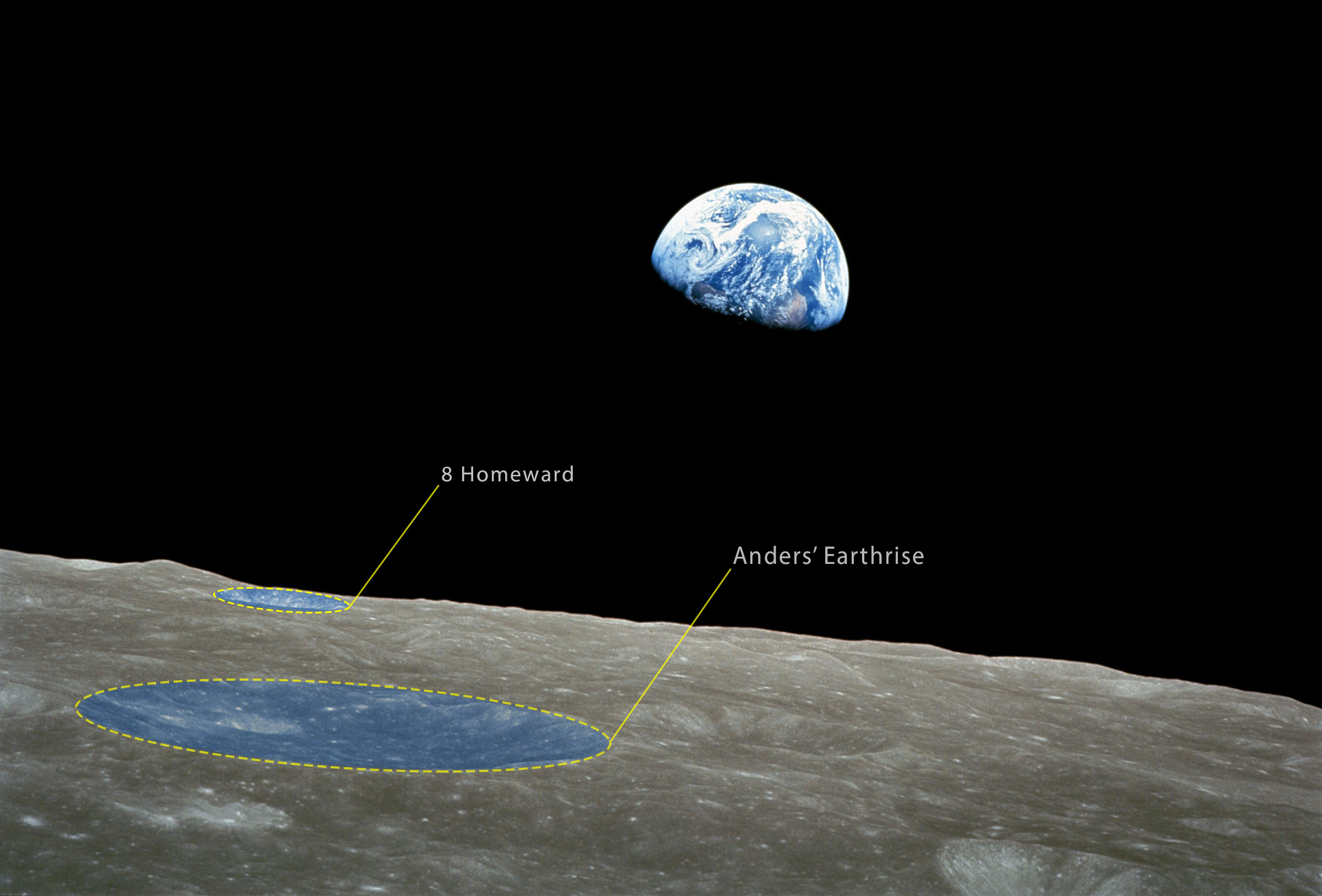
Annotated version

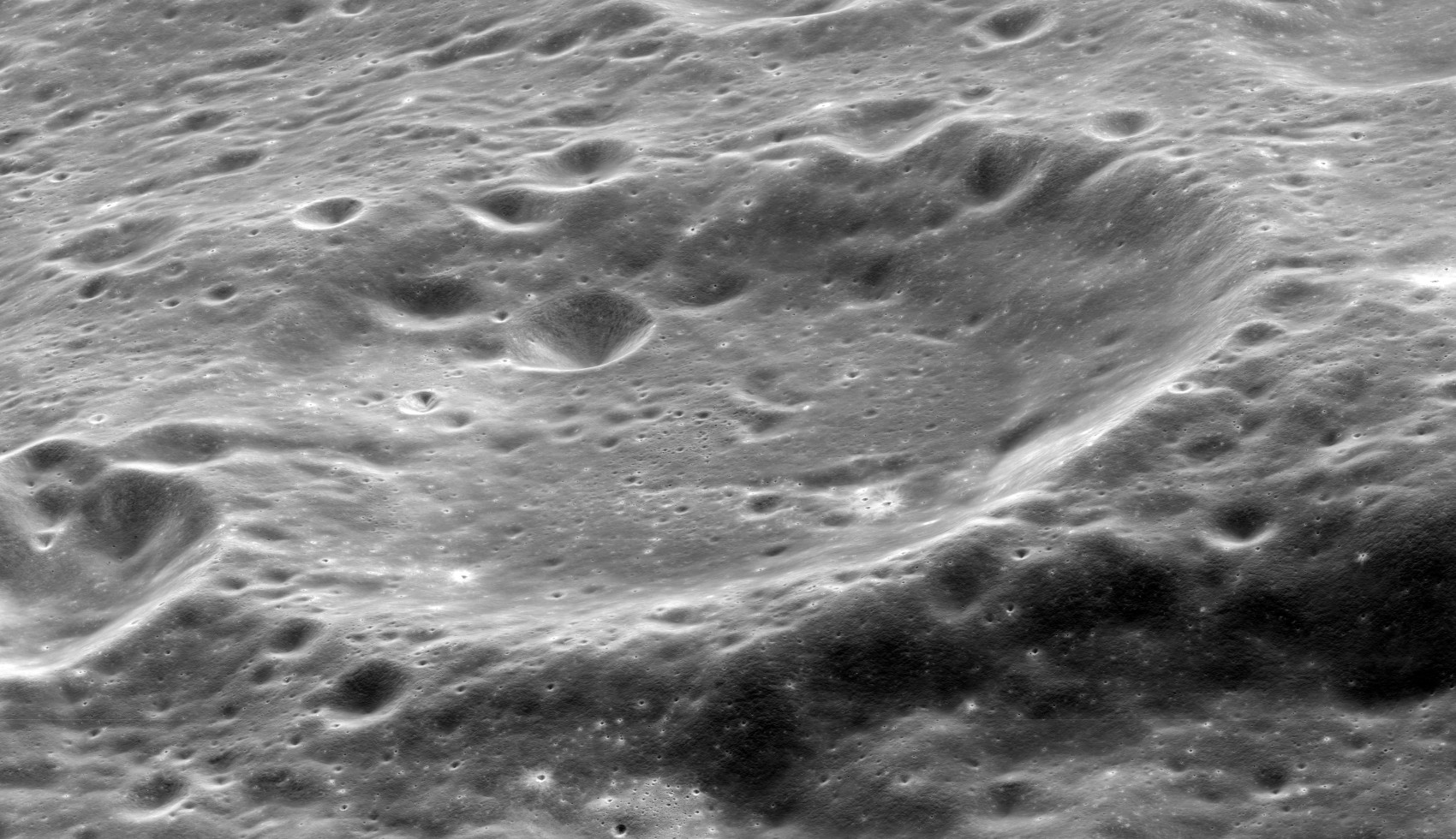
Oblique view from Apollo 17 panoramic camera
