= Aleksey Pavlovitch Hansky =

Russian astronomer

- Алексей Павлович Ганский
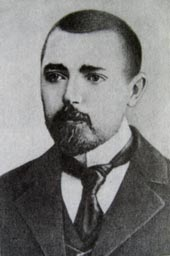
- Aleksey Hansky in 1907
- Born: July 20, 1870; Odessa
- Died: August 11, 1908 (aged 38); Simeiz
- Education: Odesa University
- Occupation: Astronomer
- Known for: Ganskiy crater, asteroid 1118 Hanskya are named after him

Aleksey Pavlovitch Hansky (Алексей Павлович Ганский; 20 July 1870, in Odessa – 11 August 1908, in Simeiz) was an astronomer from the Russian Empire.

== Biography ==
Hansky graduated from the Gymnasium and the University of Odessa. He did research on astrophysics and astrophotography in multi-year stays at the Observatory of Meudon and at the Astrophysical Observatory Potsdam, where his main interest was the structure and activity of the solar surface. In particular he worked on the solar constant, granulation and sun spots.

Hansky was a participant in several scientific expeditions. He observed from Novaya Zemlya the solar eclipse of 9 August 1896 and from Alcossebre the solar eclipse of 30 August 1905. In 1901 he participated in an expedition to Spitsbergen to make astronomical/geodetical measurements of the figure of the Earth. In 1907 he was a member of an expedition to Turkestan to observe the solar eclipse of 14 January 1907 but unfavorable weather thwarted the expedition's purpose. For observations, experiments and astrophotography, Hansy climbed Mont Blanc more than ten times.

In 1905 he became an adjunct astronomer at Pulkovo Observatory. Early in 1908 he accepted a position at Simeiz Observatory, which was founded in 1900, and moved there in May 1908. After embarking on a new research program he died in August of a heart attack while swimming in the Black Sea.

The asteroid 1118 Hanskya, discovered in 1927, was named in his honor, as was the lunar crater Ganskiy.
