= 1118 Hanskya =

Asteroid

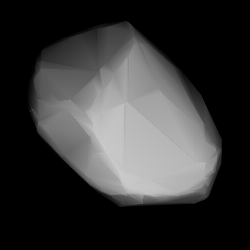
- Shape model of Hanskya from its lightcurve

Discovery
- Discovered by: S. Belyavskyj; N. Ivanov
- Discovery site: Simeiz Obs.
- Discovery date: 29 August 1927

Designations
- Named after: Alexis Hansky (Russian astronomer)
- Alternative designations: 1927 QD · 1930 DK; 1935 BM
- Minor planet category: main-belt · (outer); background

Orbital characteristics
- Epoch 4 September 2017 (JD 2458000.5)
- Uncertainty parameter 0
- Observation arc: 89.83 yr (32,810 days)
- Aphelion: 3.3560 AU
- Perihelion: 3.0694 AU
- Semi-major axis: 3.2127 AU
- Eccentricity: 0.0446
- Orbital period (sidereal): 5.76 yr (2,103 days)
- Mean anomaly: 306.45°
- Mean motion: 0° 10^{m} 16.32^{s} / day
- Inclination: 13.952°
- Longitude of ascending node: 318.76°
- Argument of perihelion: 335.05°

Physical characteristics
- Mean diameter: 70.954±0.220 km 75.495±1.037 km 77.03 km (derived); 77.20±1.7 km 79.80±1.04 km 82.14±23.50 km 82.70±28.83 km 90.29±0.59 km
- Synodic rotation period: 15.61±0.01 h
- Geometric albedo: 0.029±0.005; 0.03±0.06; 0.0358 (derived); 0.04±0.02; 0.045±0.001; 0.0470±0.002; 0.0491±0.0084; 0.056±0.003
- Spectral type: C
- Absolute magnitude (H): 9.5 · 9.70 · 9.710±0.002 (R) · 9.80 · 9.9 · 9.97

1118 Hanskya (prov. designation: 1927 QD) is a large background asteroid, approximately 77 kilometers (48 miles) in diameter, located in the outer regions of the asteroid belt. Discovered by Sergey Belyavsky and Nikolaj Ivanov in 1927, it was named after Russian astronomer Aleksey Hansky. The presumed dark C-type asteroid has a rotation period of 15.6 hours.

== Discovery ==
Hanskya was discovered on 29 August 1927, by Russian astronomers Sergey Belyavsky and Nikolaj Ivanov at the Simeiz Observatory on the Crimean peninsula. The asteroid was independently discovered by two other prolific astronomers in the field, namely Karl Reinmuth at the German Heidelberg Observatory – who observed the body only one day later and announced it first – and by Belgian astronomer Eugène Delporte at Uccle Observatory on 17 September.

== Orbit and classification ==
Hanskya is a non-family asteroid of the main belt's background population when applying the hierarchical clustering method to its proper orbital elements. It orbits the Sun in the outer asteroid belt at a distance of 3.1–3.4 AU once every 5 years and 9 months (2,103 days). Its orbit has an eccentricity of 0.04 and an inclination of 14° with respect to the ecliptic.

The body's observation arc begins at Heidelberg or Simeiz one night after its official discovery observation.

== Naming ==
This minor planet was named on the 25th anniversary of the death of Russian Aleksey Hansky (1870–1908), whose initiative lead to the construction of the discovering Simeiz Observatory.

== Physical characteristics ==
Hanskya is an assumed carbonaceous C-type asteroid.

=== Rotation period ===
In October 21010, a rotational lightcurve of Hanskya was obtained from photometric observations at the Sunflower Observatory in Kansas, United States (739). Lightcurve analysis gave a rotation period of 15.61 hours with a brightness amplitude of 0.18 magnitude (U=2).

More recent observations at the Palomar Transient Factory and by French amateur astronomer René Roy gave a longer period of 25.31 and 25.3481 hours and an amplitude of 0.38 and 0.25, respectively (U=2/2).

=== Diameter and albedo ===
According to the surveys carried out by the Infrared Astronomical Satellite IRAS, the Japanese Akari satellite and the NEOWISE mission of NASA's Wide-field Infrared Survey Explorer, Hanskya measures between 70.954 and 90.29 kilometers in diameter and its surface has an albedo between 0.029 and 0.056.

The Collaborative Asteroid Lightcurve Link derives a low albedo of 0.0358 and a diameter of 77.03 kilometers based on an absolute magnitude of 9.8.
