= Hilbert (crater) =

Crater on the Moon

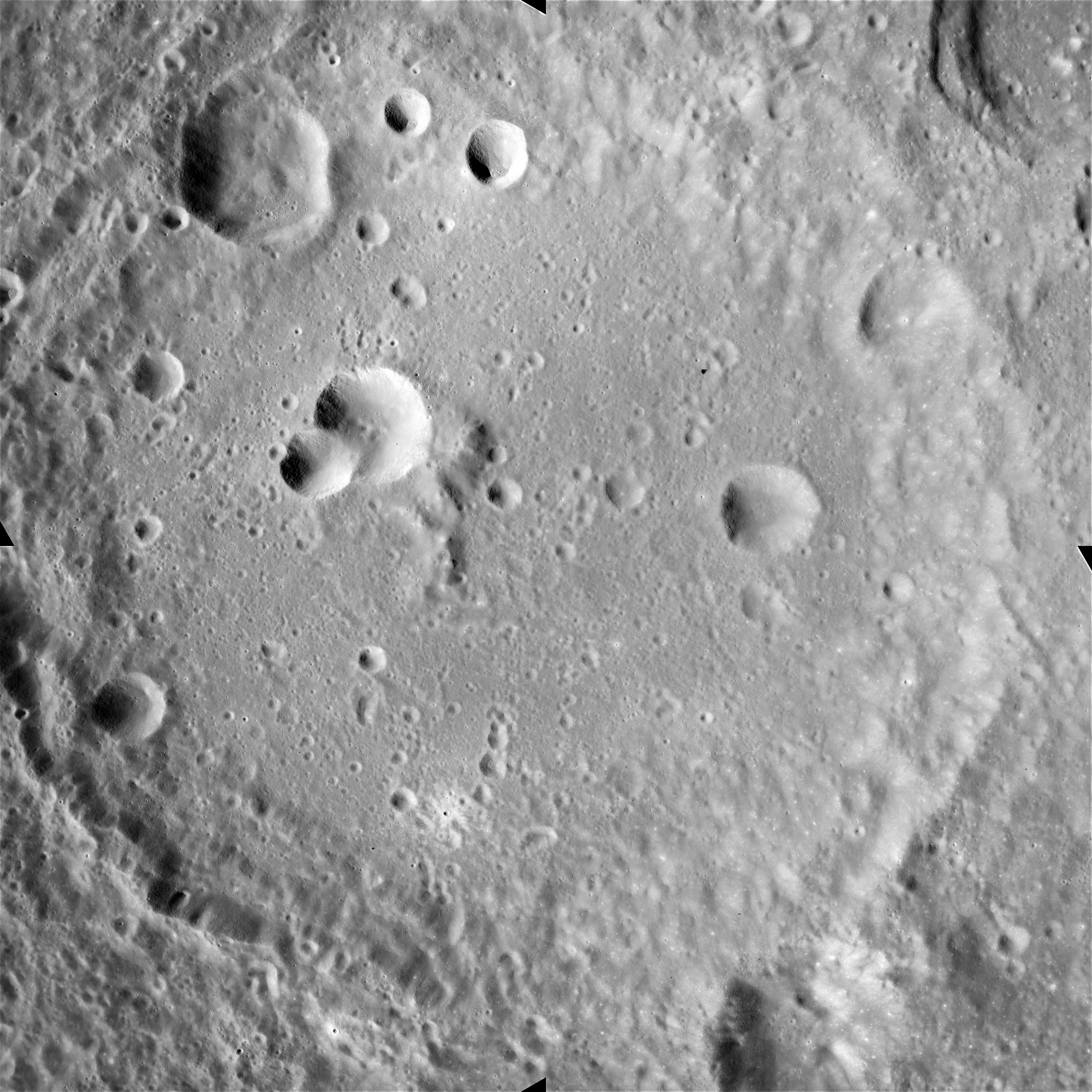
- Hilbert from Apollo 15. NASA photo.
- Coordinates: 17.87°S 108.32°E
- Diameter: 173.24 km
- Depth: 4.1 km
- Colongitude: 254° at sunrise
- Formation: Nectarian
- Eponym: David Hilbert

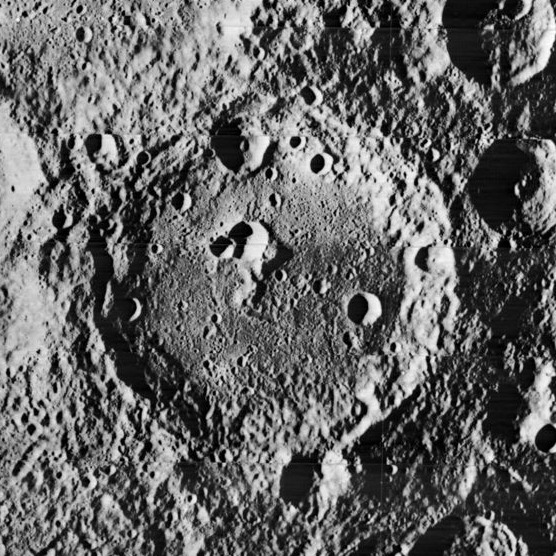
Lunar Orbiter 2 image

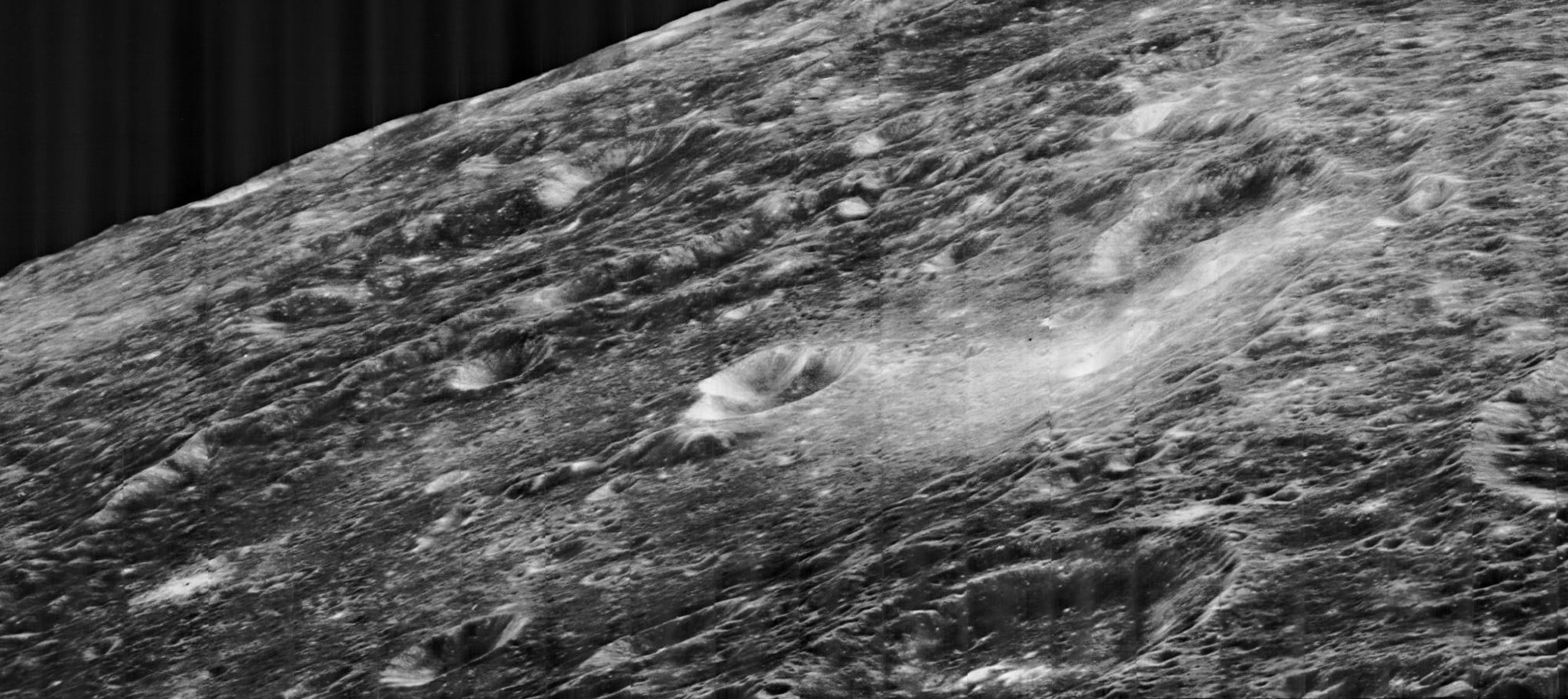
Oblique Lunar Orbiter 1 image

Hilbert is a lunar impact crater that is located on the far side of the Moon, just past the southeast limb. It is named for German mathematician David Hilbert. It lies just beyond the region of the surface that is occasionally brought into view due to libration, and so this feature cannot be observed directly from the Earth.

The crater is attached to the southeast rim of the walled plain named Pasteur, a formation nearly half as large again as Hilbert. To the southeast of Hilbert is the smaller crater Alden, while Backlund lies to the west-northwest.

Much of the outer rim of Hilbert remains relatively intact, although it is heavily eroded in places particularly in the south. The interior is relatively flat, but has been deeply gouged by several small craters. There is a short range of central ridges offset to the west of the interior midpoint. The infrared spectrum of pure crystalline plagioclase has been identified on this rise. Just to the west of the ridges is Hilbert W, a crater with a smaller crater overlying the western rim, giving it a pear-like shape. Hilbert H is a circular, bowl-shaped crater in the east part of the floor. Next to the northern rim is Hilbert Y. There are also many lesser craterlets scattered about the interior.

It is characterised by an extremely high rockfall density by lunar standards.

Hilbert is one of the largest craters of Nectarian age.

== Satellite craters ==
By convention these features are identified on lunar maps by placing the letter on the side of the crater midpoint that is closest to Hilbert.

Hilbert	Latitude	Longitude	Diameter
A	15.9° S	108.7° E	11 km
E	16.5° S	111.8° E	49 km
G	19.0° S	114.0° E	50 km
H	18.2° S	109.6° E	14 km
L	21.2° S	108.9° E	32 km
S	18.1° S	105.8° E	12 km
W	17.1° S	107.6° E	20 km
Y	15.6° S	107.5° E	28 km
