= Earthrise =

1968 photograph of Earth from lunar orbit

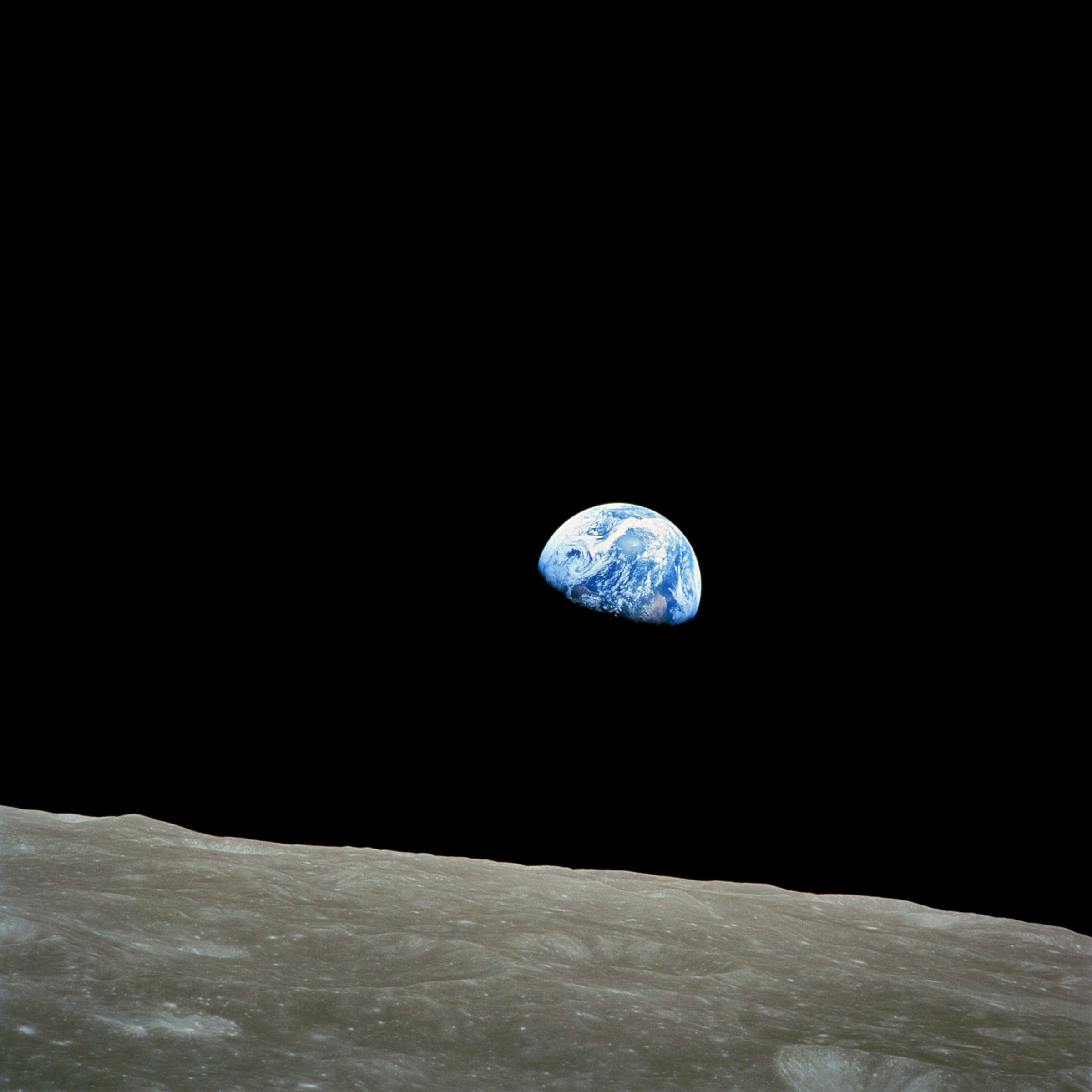
Earthrise, taken on December 24, 1968, by Apollo 8 astronaut William Anders

Earthrise is a photograph of Earth taken from lunar orbit by American astronaut William Anders on December 24, 1968, during the Apollo 8 mission. Nature photographer Galen Rowell described it as "the most influential environmental photograph ever taken".

== Details ==
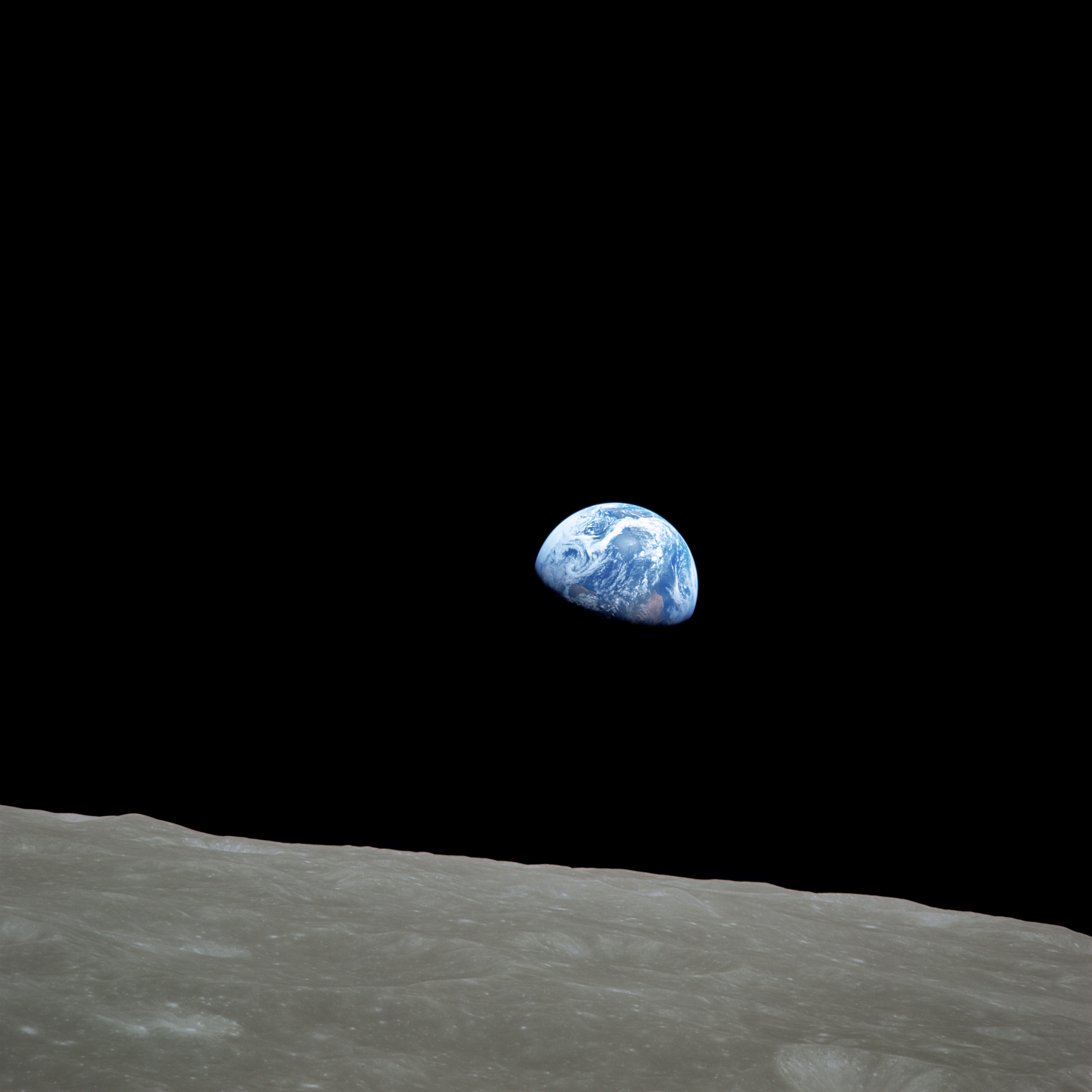
Color-calibrated version

The first photograph of Earth from the Moon by a person, also by Anders, taken shortly before Earthrise (for a colorized version see this image)

The conversation between Frank Borman, Jim Lovell, and William Anders during the taking of the Earthrise photograph

Earthrise was taken by astronaut William Anders during the Apollo 8 mission, the first crewed voyage to orbit the Moon. Accounts persisted for years that mission commander Frank Borman took the picture, or at least the first in black-and-white, with the Earth's terminator touching the horizon, before Anders found a suitable 70 mm color film. In fact, Anders took all three photographs. The land mass position and cloud patterns in this image are the same as those of the color photograph entitled Earthrise.

The photograph was taken from lunar orbit on December 24, 1968, 16:39:39.3 UTC, with a highly modified Hasselblad 500 EL with an electric drive. The camera had a simple sighting ring, rather than the standard reflex viewfinder, and was loaded with a 70 mm film magazine containing custom Ektachrome film developed by Kodak. Anders had been photographing the lunar surface with a 250 mm lens, which he then used for the Earthrise images.

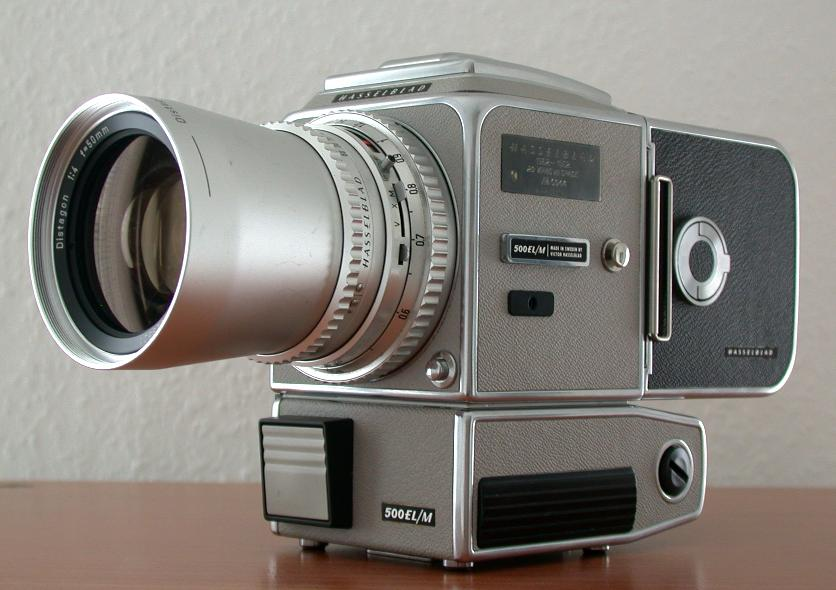
A copy of the modified Hasselblad 500 EL camera used

Anders: "Oh my God! Look at that picture over there! There's the Earth coming up. Wow, that's pretty."
Borman (joking): "Hey, don't take that, it's not scheduled."
Anders (laughing): "You got a color film, Jim? Hand me that roll of color quick, would you ..."
Lovell: "Oh man, that's great!"

There were many images taken at that point. The mission audio tape establishes several photographs were taken, on Borman's orders, with the enthusiastic concurrence of Jim Lovell and Anders. After Anders took the first color shot, Lovell noted the setting (1/250th of a second at f/11), and then Anders took a second, similar shot (AS08-14-2384).

A black-and-white reproduction of Borman's image appeared in his 1988 autobiography, captioned, "One of the most famous pictures in photographic history – taken after I grabbed the camera away from Bill Anders". Borman noted that this was the image "the Postal Service used on a stamp, and few photographs have been more frequently reproduced". The photograph reproduced is not the same image as the Anders photograph; aside from the orientation, the cloud patterns differ. Borman later recanted this story and agreed that the black-and-white shot was also taken by Anders, based on evidence presented by transcript and a video produced by NASA Goddard Space Flight Center Scientific Visualization Studio employee, Ernie Wright.

The stamp issue reproduces the cloud, color, and crater patterns of the Anders picture. Anders is described by Borman as holding "a masters degree in nuclear engineering"; Anders was thus tasked as "the scientific crew member ... also performing the photography duties that would be so important to the Apollo crew who actually landed on the Moon".

On the 50th anniversary of the Apollo 8 mission in 2018, Anders stated: "It really undercut my religious beliefs. The idea that things rotate around the pope and up there is a big supercomputer wondering whether Billy was a good boy yesterday? It doesn't make any sense. I became a big buddy of [atheist scientist] Richard Dawkins."

=== Geometry ===
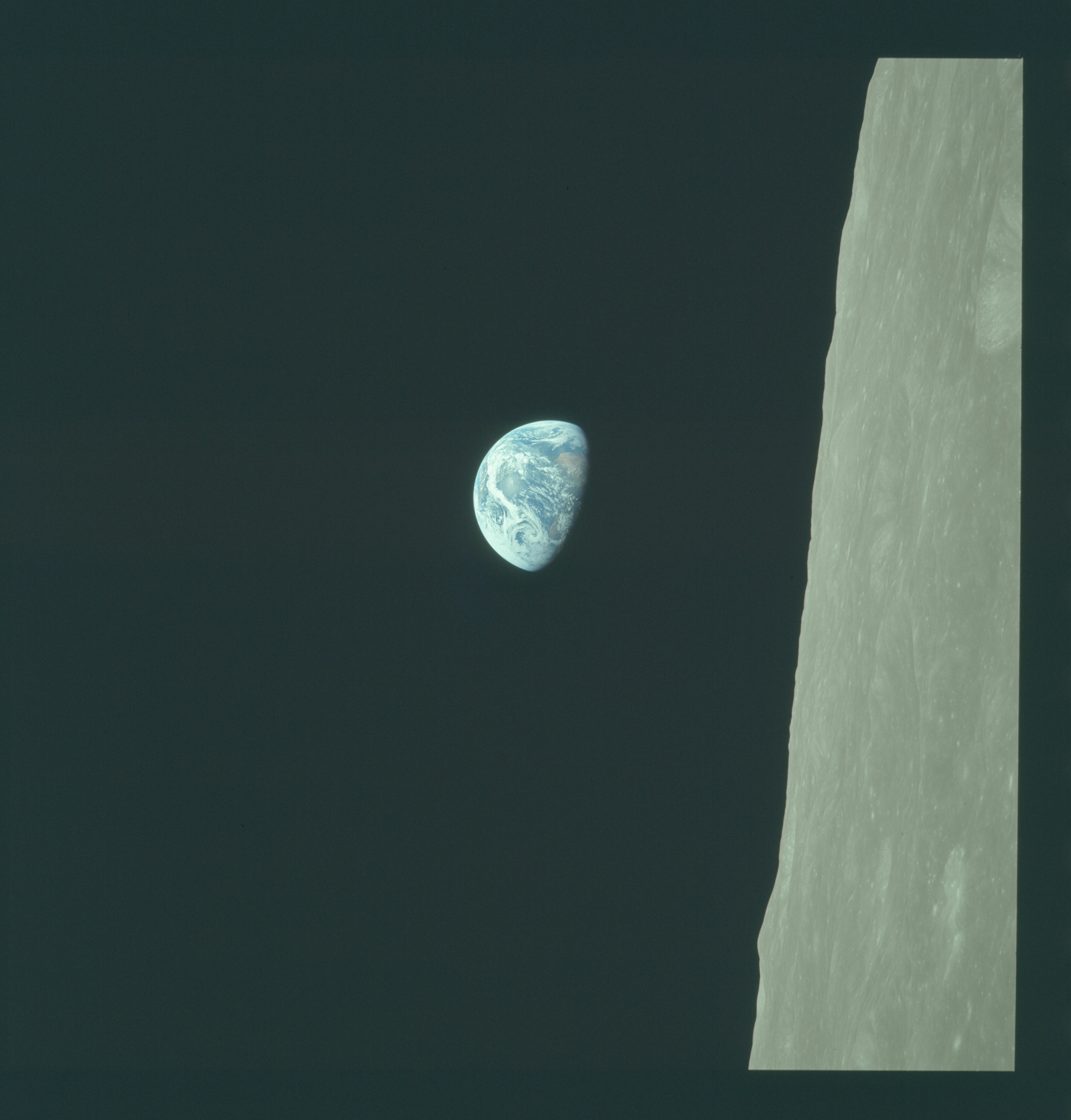
AS08-14-2383 (21713574299), from which Earthrise was cropped. The photo is displayed here in its original orientation as seen by the crew of Apollo 8. Lunar north is up.

The original image was rotated 95 degrees clockwise to produce the published Earthrise orientation to better convey the sense of the Earth rising over the moonscape. The published photograph shows Earth rotated clockwise about 135° from the typical north–south-Pole-oriented perspective, with south to the left.

== Legacy ==
Anders' images were the first of their kind. Previous images were taken robotically and in black-and-white by the Lunar Orbiter program robotic probes, which in 1966 took the first ever image of Earth above the Moon, similar to the Earthrise image.

Earthrise was used as the cover photograph for the Spring 1969 issue of the Whole Earth Catalog.

In Life's 2003 book 100 Photographs that Changed the World, wilderness photographer Galen Rowell called Earthrise "the most influential environmental photograph ever taken". Another author called its appearance the beginning of the environmental movement. Fifty years to the day after taking the photo, William Anders observed, "We set out to explore the moon and instead discovered the Earth."

In October 2018, two of the craters seen in the photo were named Anders' Earthrise and 8 Homeward by the Working Group for Planetary System Nomenclature (WGPSN) of the International Astronomical Union. The craters had previously been designated only with letters. In May 2026, the main belt asteroid 1998 YT_{7}, which was discovered at the Catalina Sky Survey on December 24, 1998 (the 30th anniversary of the Earthrise photograph), was named (79871) Earthrise.

Joni Mitchell sings on her 1976 song "Refuge of the Roads": "In a highway service station / Over the month of June / Was a photograph of the Earth / Taken coming back from the Moon / And you couldn't see a city / On that marbled bowling ball / Or a forest or a highway / Or me here least of all …"

=== Stamp ===
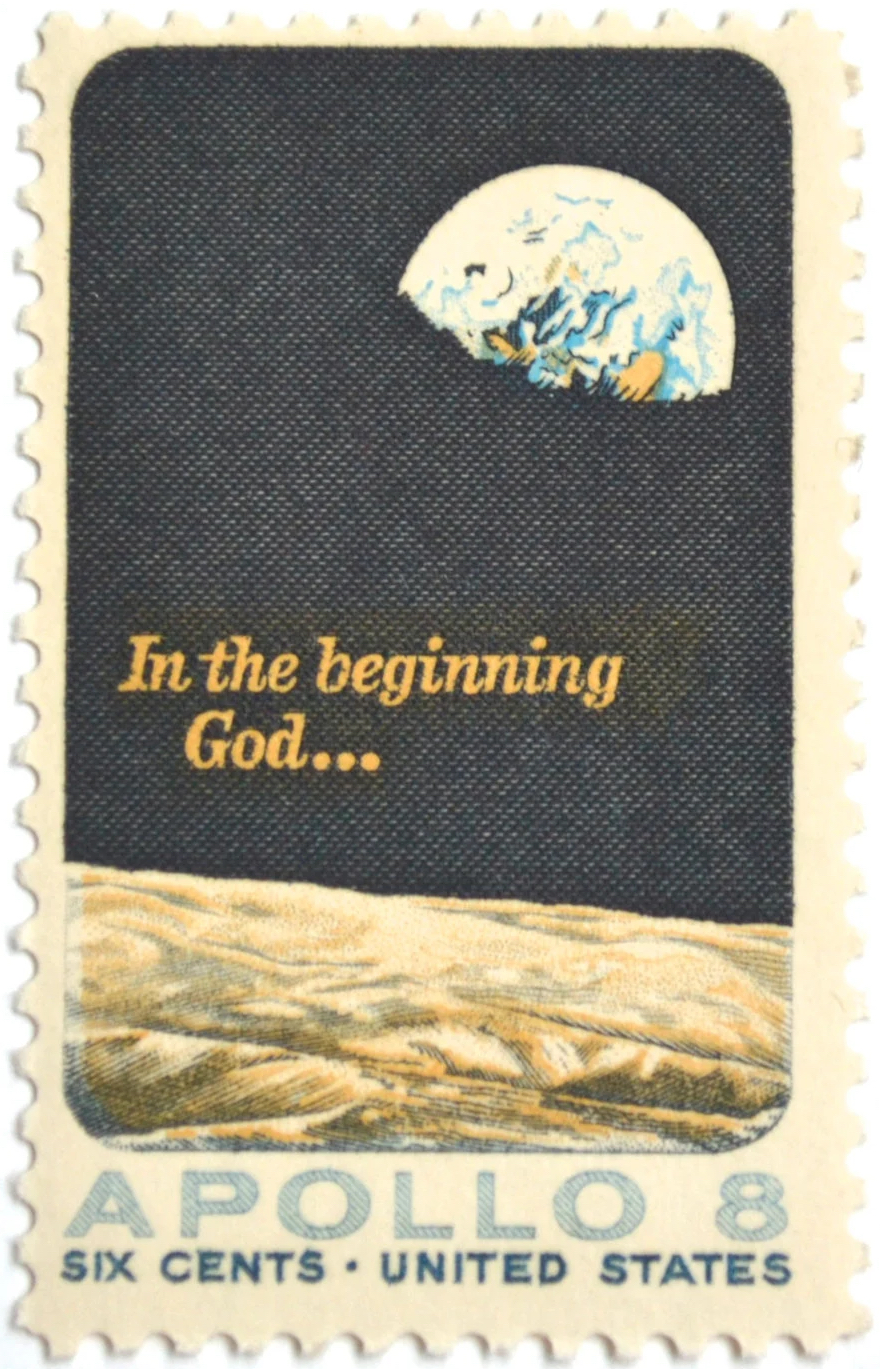
U.S. postage stamp (Scott #1371)

In 1969, the U.S. Postal Service issued a stamp (Scott# 1371) commemorating the Apollo 8 flight around the Moon. The stamp featured a detail (in color) of the Earthrise photograph, and the words, "In the beginning God...", recalling the Apollo 8 Genesis reading.

=== 2013 simulation ===
In 2013, in commemoration of the 45th anniversary of the Apollo 8 mission, NASA issued a video about the taking of the photograph. This computer-generated visualization used data from the Lunar Reconnaissance Orbiter spacecraft, which had provided detailed images of the lunar surface that could be matched with those taken every 20 seconds by an automatic camera on Apollo 8. The resulting video, re-creating what the astronauts would have seen (rotated 90 degrees clockwise to match the perspective presented in the photograph), was synchronized with the recording of the crew's conversation as they became the first humans to witness an Earthrise. The video reconstruction team was led by Ernie Wright, and included explanatory narration written and read by Andrew Chaikin. Chaikin writes that all the photographs of the rising Earth on Apollo 8's fourth orbit were taken by Anders.

=== Artemis II ===
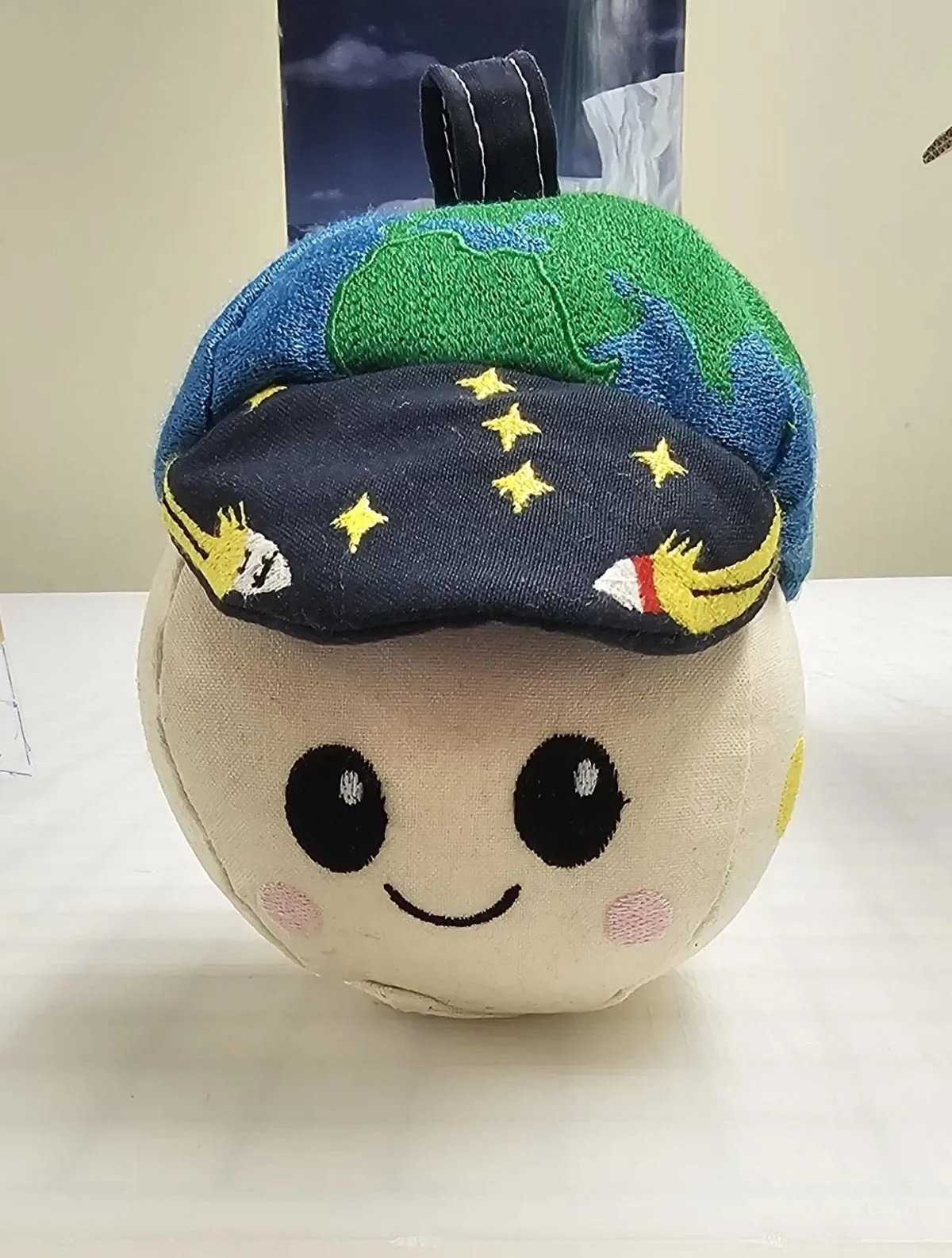
Artemis II zero-gravity indicator called Rise

Earthrise served as a basis for the 2026 Artemis II crewed lunar flyby mission patch, down to the cloud patterns. The mission's zero-gravity indicator, a stuffed toy named Rise, was also designed after the photograph.

Earthset, by Christina Koch of the Artemis II mission, 2026

==== Earthset ====
On April 6, 2026, a new photograph similar to Earthrise, titled Earthset, was taken by crew member Christina Koch during Artemis II's lunar flyby using a Nikon D5 camera.

== Potential earthrises as seen from the Moon's surface ==
The Earth "rose" because the spacecraft was traveling over the Moon's surface. An earthrise that might be witnessed from the surface of the Moon would be quite unlike moonrises on Earth. Because the Moon is tidally locked with the Earth, one side of the Moon always faces toward Earth. Interpretation of this fact would lead one to believe that the Earth's position is fixed on the lunar sky and no earthrises can occur; however, the Moon librates slightly, which causes the Earth to draw a Lissajous figure on the sky. This figure fits inside a rectangle 15°48' wide and 13°20' high (in angular dimensions), while the angular diameter of the Earth as seen from the Moon is only about 2°. This means that earthrises are visible near the edge of the Earth-observable surface of the Moon (about 20% of the surface). Since a full libration cycle takes about 27 days, earthrises are very slow, and it takes about 48 hours for Earth to clear its diameter. During the course of the month-long lunar orbit, an observer would additionally witness a succession of "Earth phases", much like the lunar phases seen from Earth. That is what accounts for the half-illuminated globe's earthlight.

== See also ==
- List of photographs considered the most important
- The Blue Marble
- Pale Blue Dot
- Hello, World
- First images of Earth from space
- Earth phase
