= Ganskiy (crater) =

Crater on the Moon

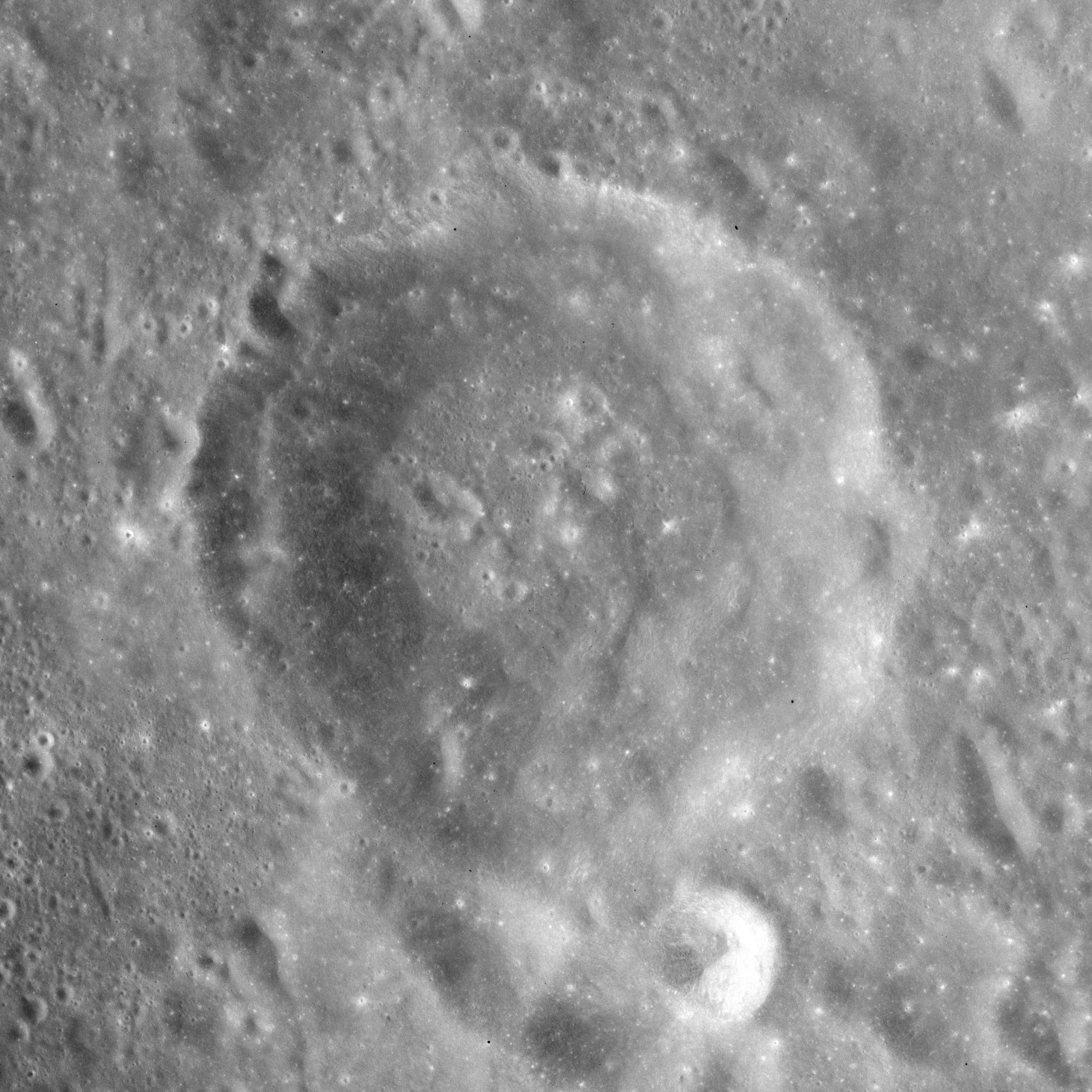
- Apollo 15 Mapping Camera image
- Coordinates: 9.7°S 97.0°E
- Diameter: 42.11 km (26.17 mi)
- Depth: 3.37 km (2.09 mi)
- Colongitude: 264° at sunrise
- Eponym: Aleksey P. Ganskiy

Ganskiy is a lunar impact crater that is located on the far side of the Moon. It lies to the southeast of the walled plain named Hirayama.

The rim of this crater is roughly circular, with a slight hexagonal appearance. There is some wear along the rim, particularly along the southwest where a pair of small craterlets lie next to the edge. The inner sides are unremarkable, and the interior floor is relatively level with a slight rise to the south of the midpoint. There is a tiny crater near the western inner wall.

This formation is named after Russian astronomer Aleksey Pavlovitch Hansky. It is sometimes listed as Ganskij, Gansky, Hansky, or Hanskiy, but Ganskiy is the spelling recognized by the International Astronomical Union. The crater's name was officially adopted in 1970.

== Satellite craters ==
By convention these features are identified on lunar maps by placing the letter on the side of the crater midpoint that is closest to Ganskiy.

Ganskiy	Latitude	Longitude	Diameter
F	9.6° S	99.0° E	9 km
H	10.7° S	99.7° E	21 km
K	12.5° S	98.4° E	13 km
S	10.2° S	94.7° E	22 km

Ganskiy M crater was renamed 8 Homeward in October 2018.

== Gallery ==
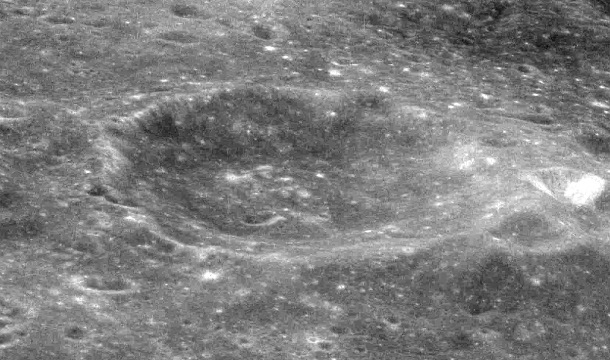
Oblique view from Apollo 8, facing east

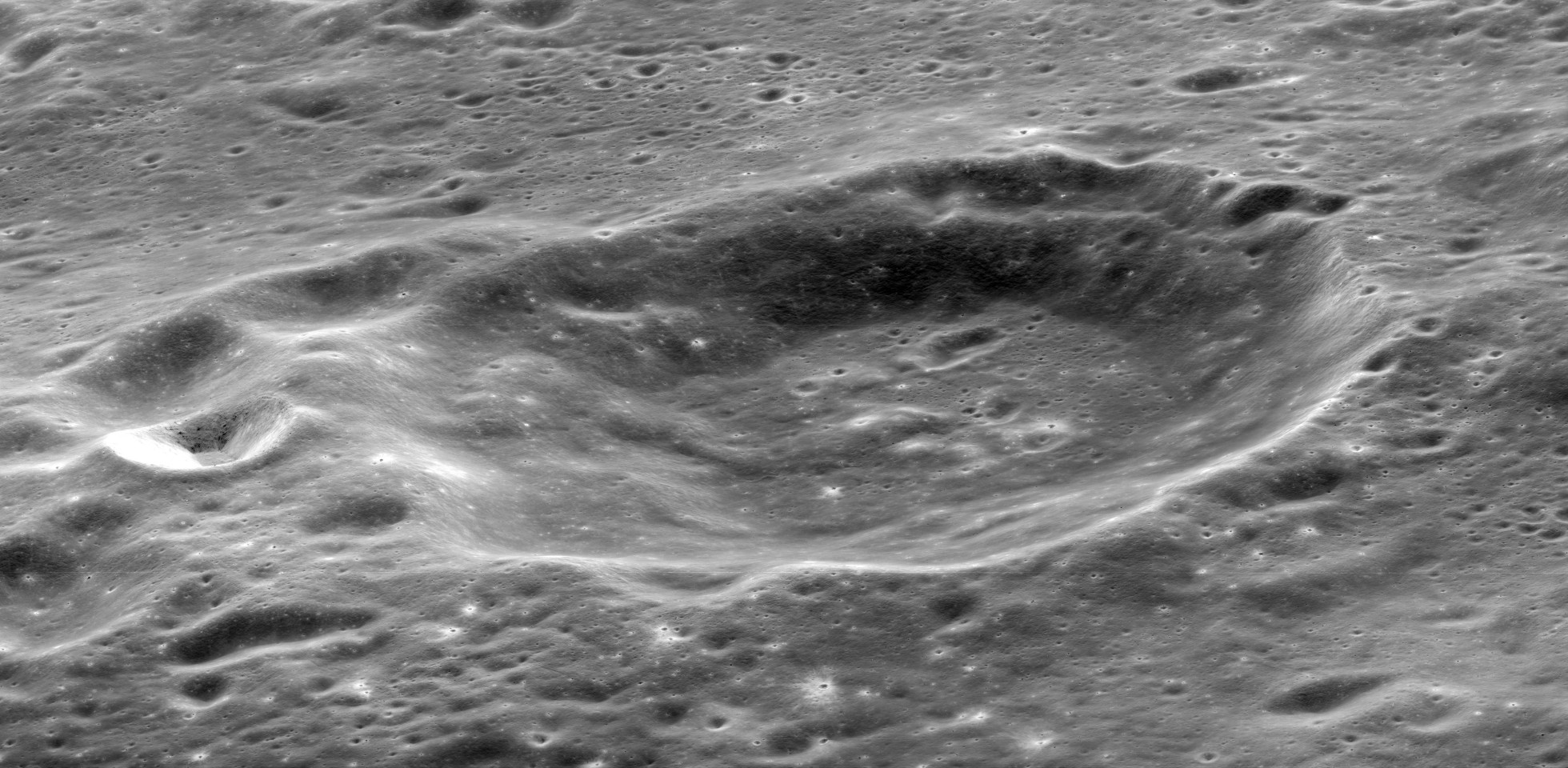
Oblique view from Apollo 17, facing west

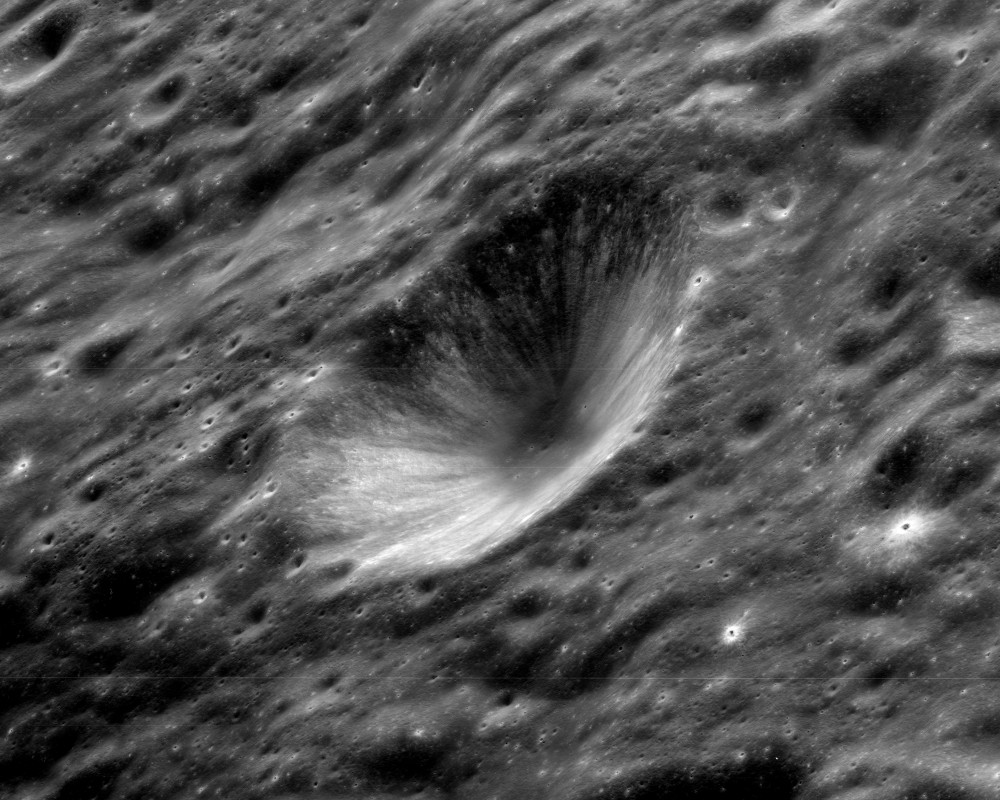
Oblique view of 8 Homeward crater (formerly Ganskiy M) from Apollo 17 panoramic camera
