= Pasteur (lunar crater) =

Crater on the Moon

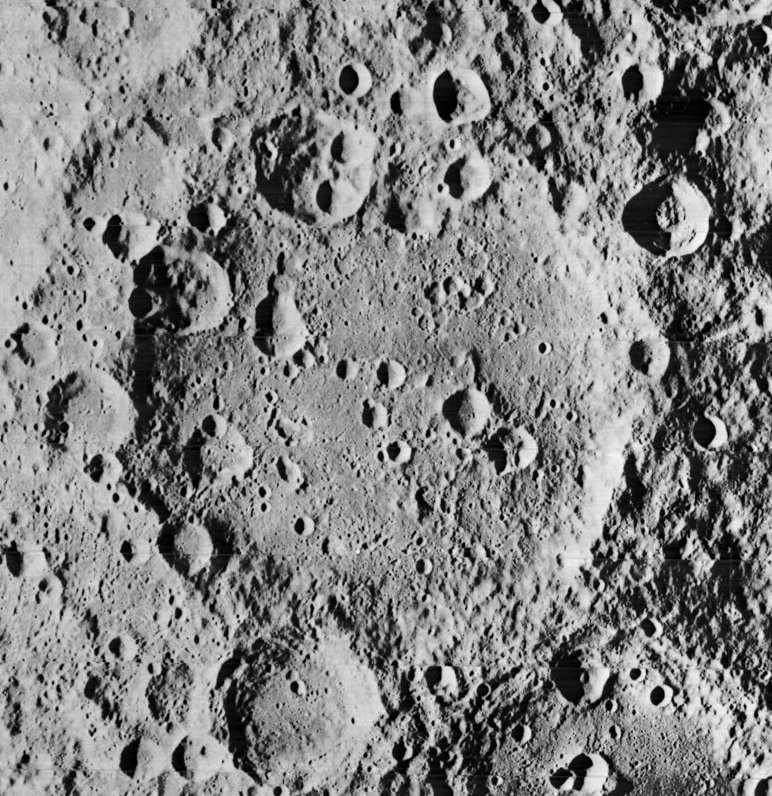
- Lunar Orbiter 2 image
- Coordinates: 11.9°S 104.6°E
- Diameter: 232.77 km (144.64 mi)
- Colongitude: 259° at sunrise
- Formation: Pre-Nectarian
- Eponym: Louis Pasteur

Pasteur is a large lunar impact crater, approximately 233 kilometers in diameter, belonging to the category termed a walled plain. It was named after French chemist and microbiologist Louis Pasteur. It lies on the far side of the Moon as seen from the Earth, just beyond the eastern limb. The vicinity of this crater is occasionally brought into view from Earth due to librations, although not much detail can be seen.

== Description ==
Lying along the southern rim of Pasteur is the smaller crater Backlund. Just to the southeast is Hilbert, another walled plain, nearly two-thirds the diameter of Pasteur. To the southwest is the prominent crater Sklodowska, and to the east is Meitner.

This formation dates to the Pre-Nectarian period of the lunar geologic timescale. The outer rim of Pasteur is generally irregular, with sections being heavily damaged by multiple impacts. The northern rim in particular has been nearly obliterated by overlapping impacts, and the southern rim is not in much better shape with a stretch overlain by Backlund. The southeast rim of Pasteur is nearly linear near where the ground has been modified by Hilbert. Even the western rim is heavily damaged, with overlying craters Pasteur U, Anders' Earthrise crater, and Pasteur Q. (The first of these, Pasteur U, forms a merged group of overlapping craters.)

The interior is not in much better shape, with the southern half irregular from ejecta covering the surface, and several small craters lying across the floor. In the northwest part of the floor is a short chain of small, overlapping craters forming an arcing line from north to south. The satellite craters Pasteur G and Pasteur H form a pair to the east of the midpoint.

The satellite crater Pasteur D, to the northeast of Pateur, is fresh and has a ray system, and is consequently mapped as part of the Copernican System. Pasteur D was provisionally named Pasteur in 1961, but the larger crater was ultimately given the name.

== Satellite craters ==
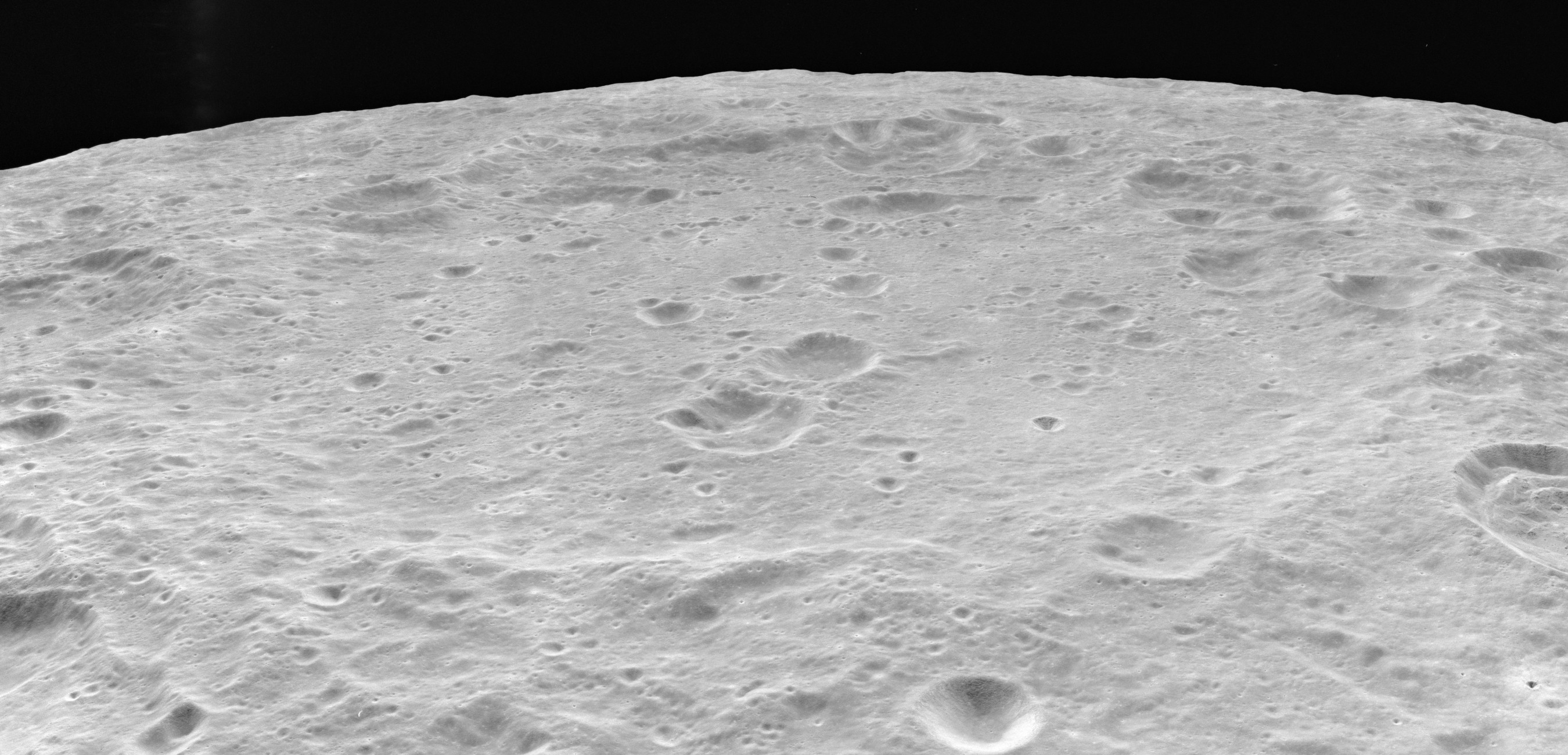
Oblique Apollo 17 Mapping Camera image of Pasteur crater

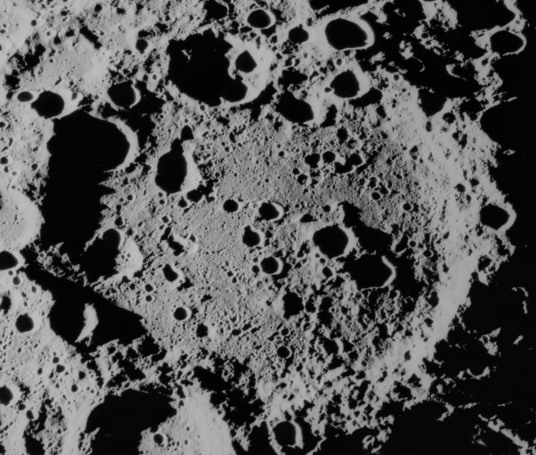
Oblique view from Apollo 15

By convention these features are identified on lunar maps by placing the letter on the side of the crater midpoint that is closest to Pasteur.

Pasteur	Latitude	Longitude	Diameter	Ref
A	7.0° S	105.7° E	25.73 km	WGPSN
B	8.2° S	105.8° E	19.44 km	WGPSN
D	8.8° S	108.8° E	37.62 km	WGPSN
E	10.8° S	108.5° E	18.9 km	WGPSN
G	11.6° S	105.7° E	20.73 km	WGPSN
H	12.1° S	106.4° E	21.6 km	WGPSN
M	12.2° S	104.6° E	11.33 km	WGPSN
Q	13.6° S	101.5° E	23.35 km	WGPSN
S	12.2° S	102.0° E	28.76 km	WGPSN
U	9.8° S	101.5° E	37.88 km	WGPSN
V	9.0° S	100.8° E	22.49 km	WGPSN
Y	8.0° S	103.5° E	49.85 km	WGPSN
Z	6.8° S	104.2° E	13.98 km	WGPSN

Pasteur D is characterised by an extremely high rockfall density by lunar standards.

Pasteur T was renamed Anders' Earthrise in October 2018.

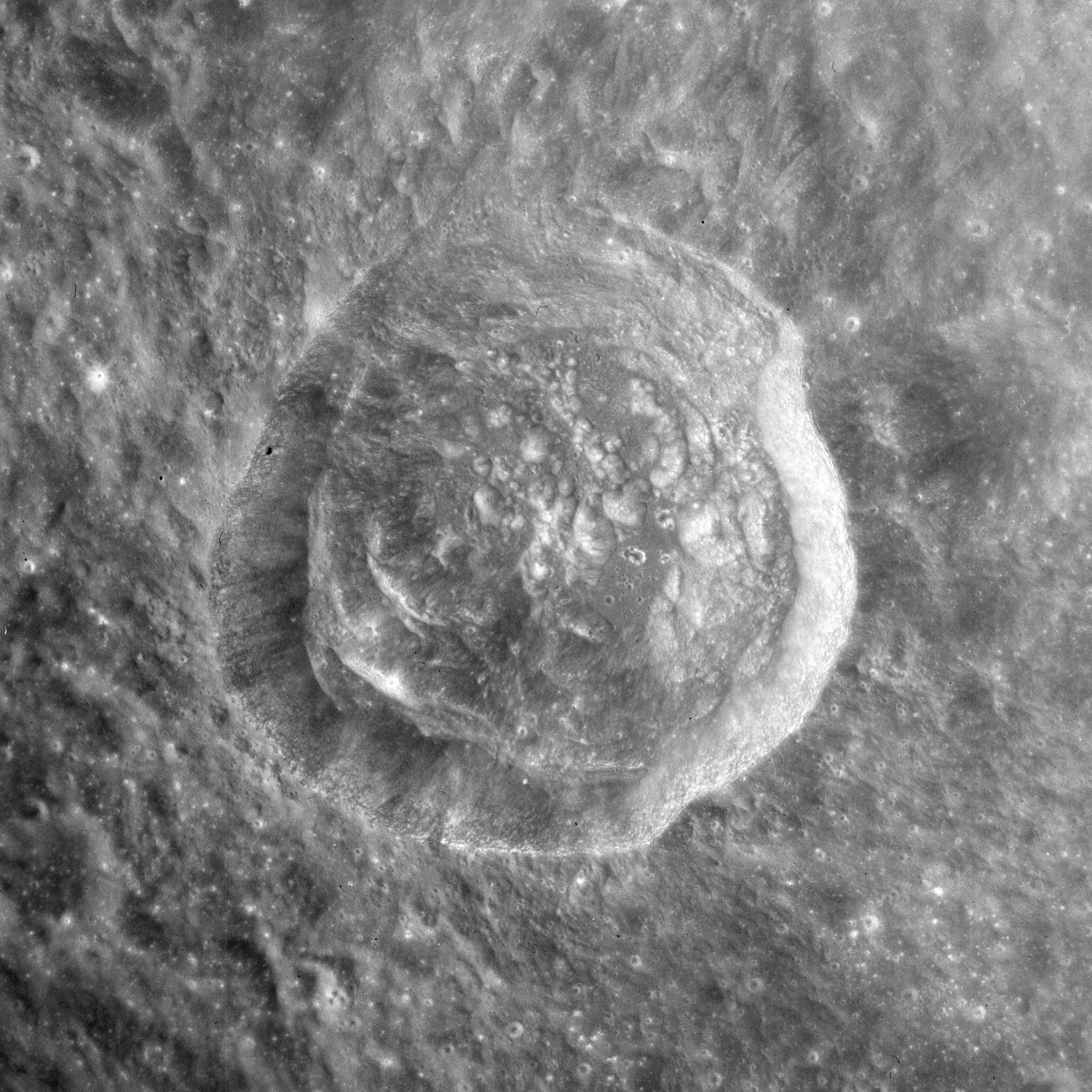
Apollo 15 image of Pasteur D

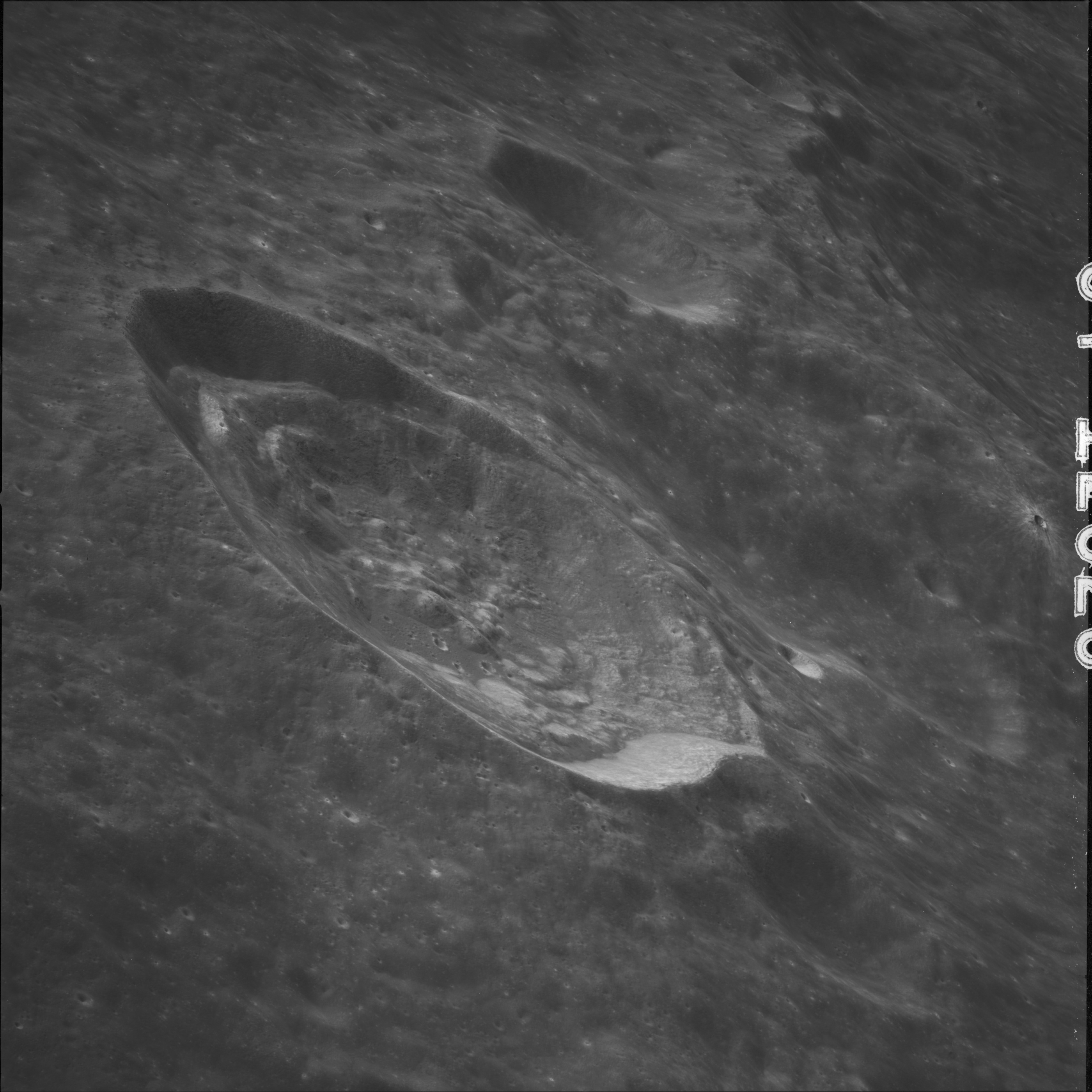
Oblique Apollo 15 image of Pasteur D

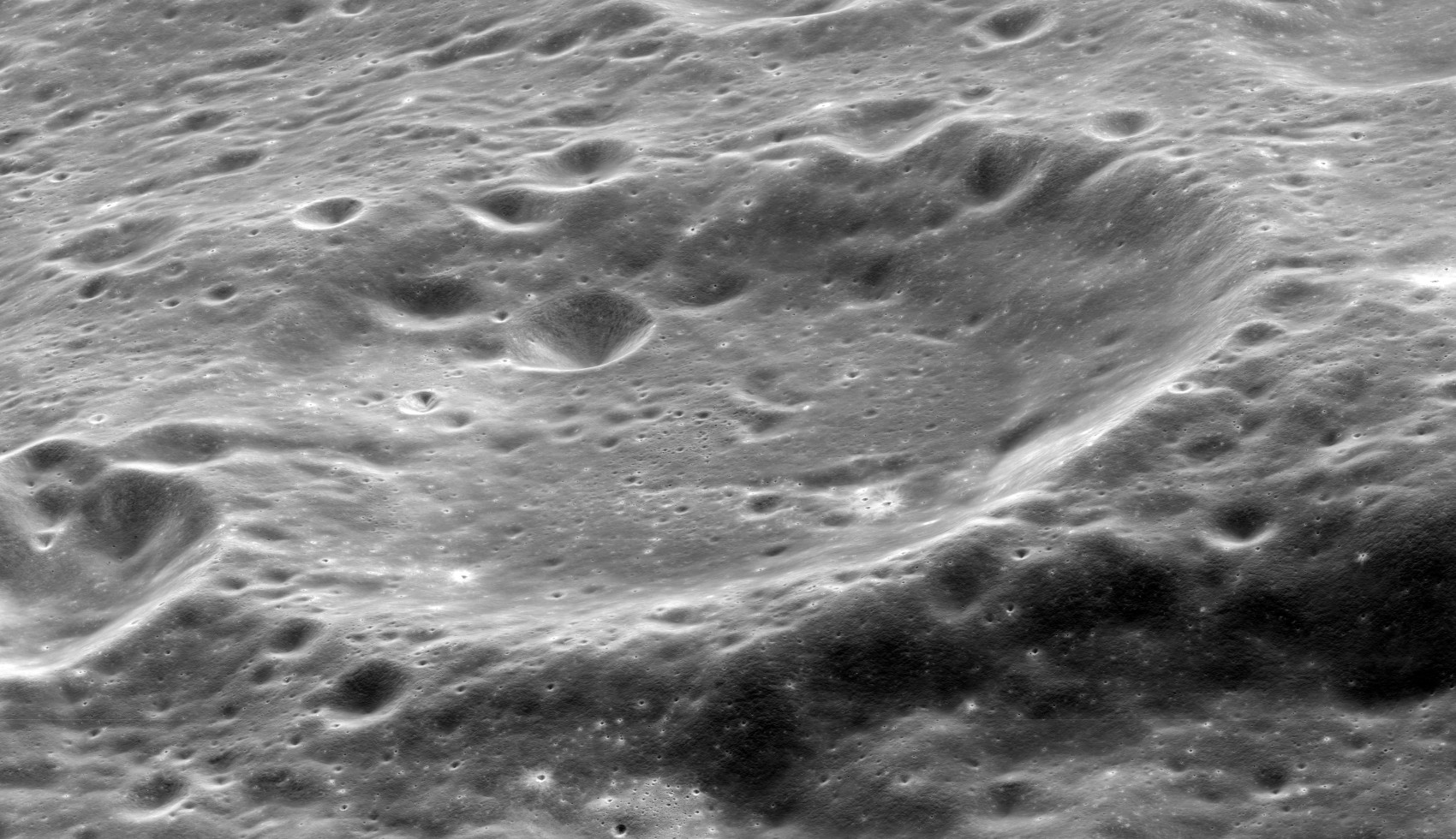
Oblique view of Anders' Earthrise crater (formerly Pasteur T) from Apollo 17 panoramic camera

== See also ==
- 4804 Pasteur, asteroid
