= Wairarapa Dark Sky Reserve =

Dark sky reserve in New Zealand

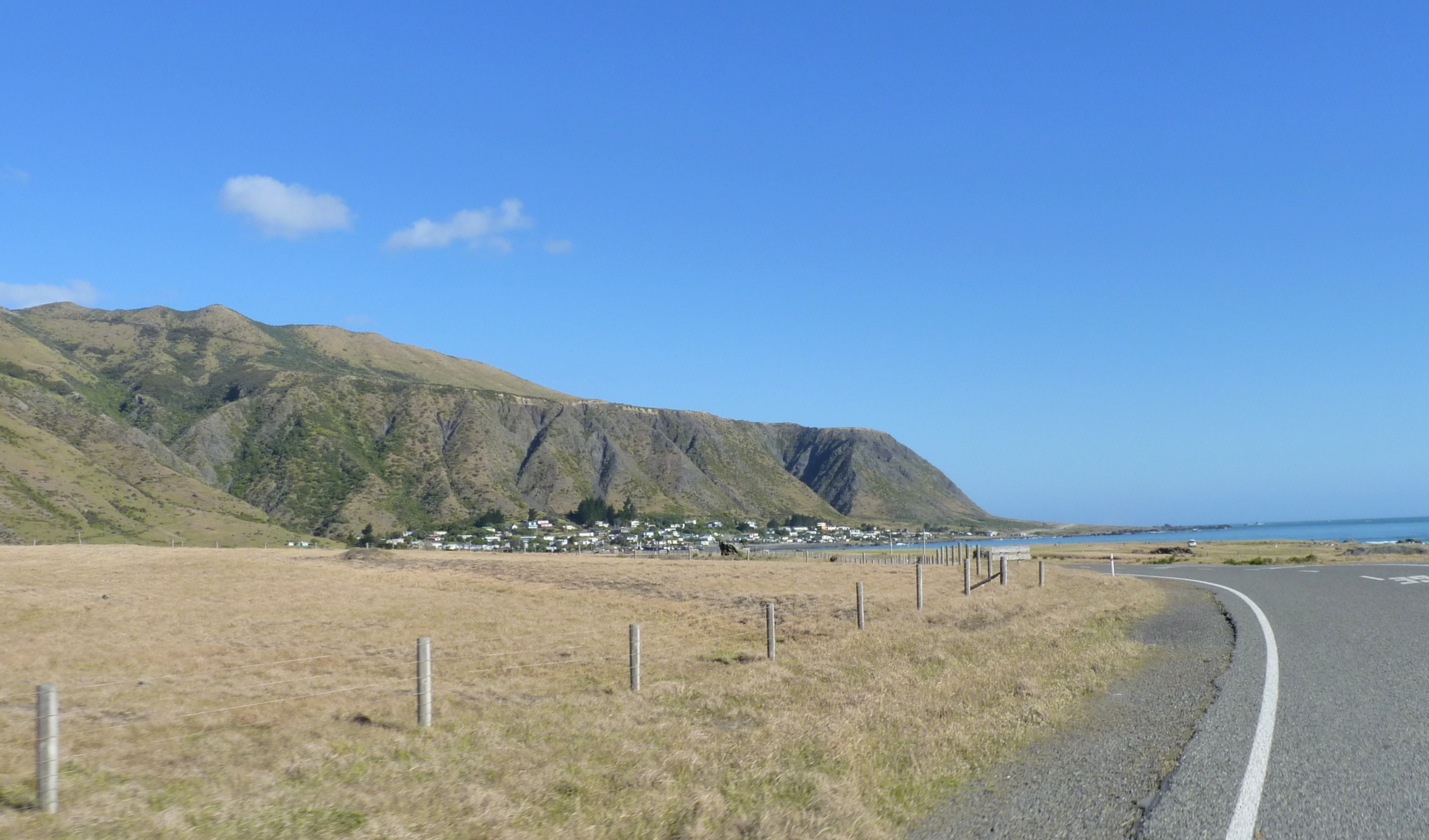
- Aorangi Forest Park within the reserve
- Interactive map of Wairarapa Dark Sky Reserve
- Location: Wairarapa, New Zealand
- Nearest town: Martinborough
- Area: 3,665 km^{2} (1,415 sq mi)
- Designated: 2023
- Governing body: Wairarapa Dark Sky Association
- Website: www.wairarapadarksky.nz

The Wairarapa Dark Sky Reserve is an International Dark Sky Reserve in the Wairarapa region in the southern part of the North Island of New Zealand. The reserve was designated by DarkSky International in January 2023. It was the second dark sky reserve to be certified in New Zealand (after the Aoraki Mackenzie International Dark Sky Reserve was recognised in 2012). The area covered by the reserve is 3,665 km^{2} (1,415 sq mi) and includes the Aorangi Forest Park, and the South Wairarapa and Carterton Districts.

The reserve is certified as an International Dark Sky Reserve, requiring a dark "core" zone that is surrounded by a populated area where policy controls protect the darkness of the core. For the Wairarapa reserve, the dark core is the entire area of the Aorangi Forest Park in the south of the reserve. All measurements of night sky luminance in the core area are darker than 21.3 mag/arcsec^{2} (corresponding to Bortle scale 3), and in places are as dark as 21.8 mag/arcsec^{2} (Bortle scale 1). Large parts of the Wairarapa region outside the core of the reserve exceed the minimum value of 21.2 mag/arcsec^{2} required for the core. Measurements taken in the town of Martinborough show that although it is located in the periphery of the reserve, it almost meets the minimum requirements for the core.

== History ==
Proposals for a dark sky reserve in the South Wairarapa District were initially developed in 2017 and presented to an initial public meeting in Martinborough. In 2018, consultation about the proposals included the Carterton and Masterton districts. At that time, the mayor of Carterton stated that their lighting already complied with the standards, and that they would join with the South Wairarapa District in making an application for designation.

An application for Dark Sky Reserve status was submitted in December 2022. The certification by DarkSky International in 2023 was the result of 5 years of volunteer work by the Wairarapa Dark Sky Association Incorporated (a registered charity in New Zealand), and the South Wairarapa and Carterton district councils, together with other local interested parties.

In 2023, the Masterton District Council, governing an area of 2,298 km^{2} (887 sq mi) adjacent to the designated reserve, began planning and consultation for potentially expanding the Wairarapa Dark Sky Reserve to include the Masterton District. The work involved in making an application includes dark sky measurements and photos, a plan for lighting, and reductions in artificial lighting including changes to types of lighting and installation of shields.

The Wellington Astronomical Society opened the Cretney Observatory near Martinborough in 2025. It houses a 400mm Testar Officina Stellare RiFAST telescope.

== See also ==
- Dark sky movement in New Zealand
- Carkeek Observatory
