= Street lights in New Zealand =

Street lights in New Zealand have evolved from 19th century gas lamps to fluorescent and LED lighting. Environmental concerns have led to changes in the installation and management of street lighting in some areas. Street lighting in New Zealand is guided by the NZ Transport Agency's 'Specification and guidelines for road lighting design (M30)' and must meet the requirements of Standards New Zealand AS/NZS1158 series: 'Lighting for roads and public spaces'.

== Gas lighting ==
Early systems of gas street lights in New Zealand were first installed in major cities from the 1860s, with Christchurch recording having 152 gas lamps throughout the city in 1876. By 1914 Christchurch had 974 gas lamps, 59 of which were still in use in 1918 after the introduction of electric lighting in 1915.

== Electric lighting ==
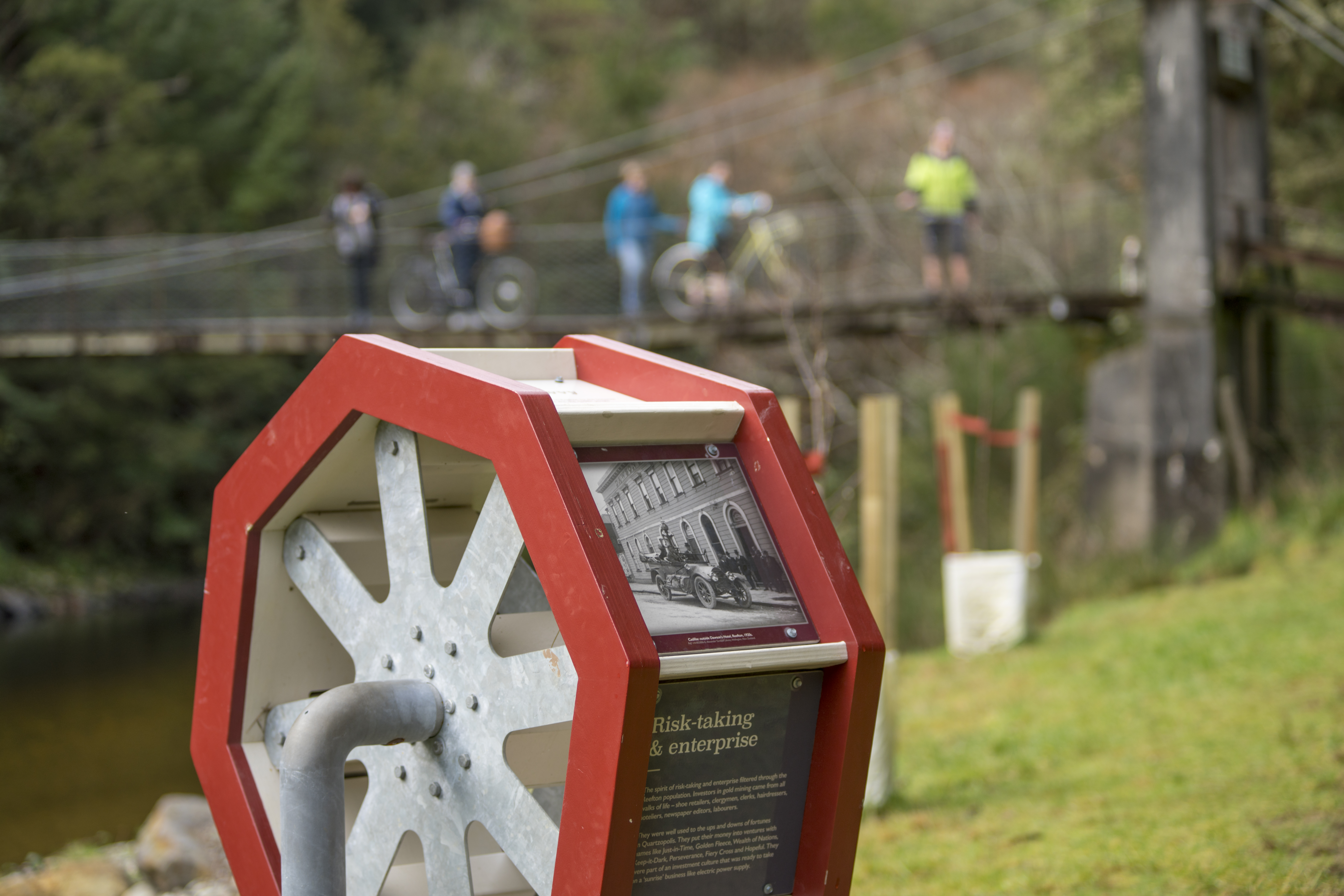
Historic walk in Reefton where New Zealand’s first public electricity was generated in 1888

In 1888, Reefton (population about 2,000) became the first place in New Zealand to light its streets and buildings with electric lights. Reefton Power Station has been listed as a Historic Place Category 2 by Heritage New Zealand.

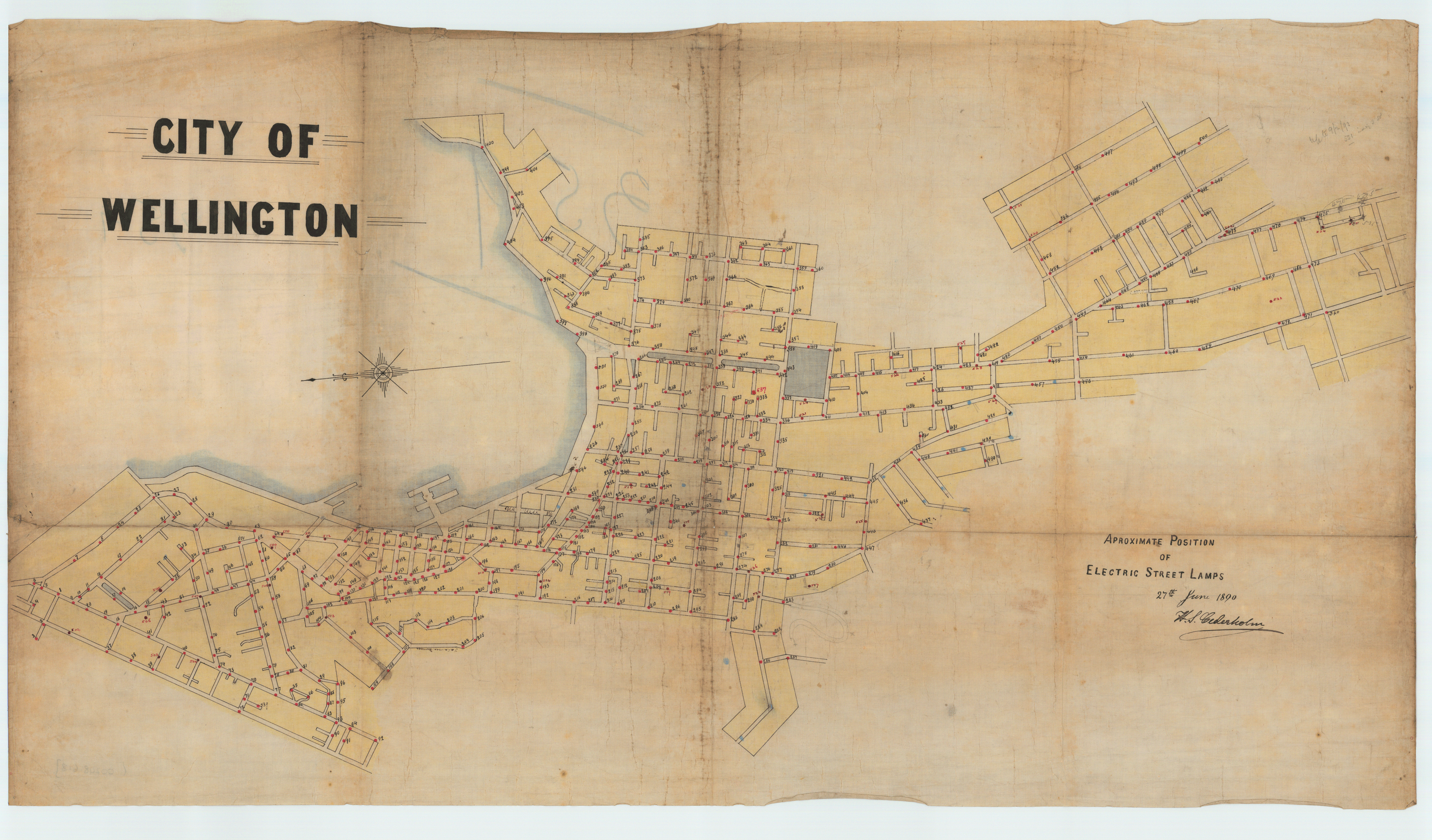
Approximate position of electric street lamps in Wellington, 1890.

Wellington introduced electric street lighting in 1889, becoming the first city in New Zealand to do so, and possibly the first city in the Southern Hemisphere to have electric street lighting. Water-driven generating stations were built in Panama Street and Manners Street to power 500 incandescent lamps installed around the city. A lamp post commemorating the introduction of electric lighting to the city stands at the intersection of Featherston Street and Lambton Quay.

Electric street lighting was installed in central Auckland in the 1910s, and in Christchurch in 1915.

=== Fluorescent lighting ===
From the early 1940s a gradual move towards fluorescent lamps began. Fluorescent lights produce a bright white light. They were seen as reducing glare, illuminating a wider area, having a more natural light and costing less to run than the electric lamps in use at the time. Fluorescent lamps were the main type of street lighting in use by the 1970s, when they started to be replaced by metal halide and high pressure sodium (HPS) lamps.

=== LED lighting ===
New Zealand, like much of the industrialised world, has been expanding the installation of LED lights, and has seen large savings. LED lighting can save up to 60% of the electricity used by HPS lights, and up to 70% if they are controlled through a central management system, for example being dimmed at certain times. The life span of an LED light is around 20 years, compared to only four years for an HPS light. There are reduced maintenance costs and improved light quality that may reduce road accidents since LED lights provide white light rather than the yellow light of HPS lights.

==== Problems in Wellington ====
In 2017–2018, 17,000 new LED street lamps were installed in Wellington. Reasons for the change were given as lower maintenance costs and longer lifespan, reduction of 80% in energy use, better colour differentiation and visibility, and the ability to dim or brighten lights remotely as needed. By 2019, Wellington City Council realised it had a problem: adaptors on the lamps were failing and causing lamps to droop or fall to the ground. The adaptors, which were not supplied, recommended or approved by the lamp manufacturer, allowed the angle of the lamps to be adjusted to reduce glare onto people's homes. They had been stress-tested under static conditions and should have been able to hold 60 kg (130 lb). However the adaptors had not been tested in vibrating conditions to imitate the effect of Wellington's sometimes strong winds. By April 2023, Wellington City Council admitted that 17 of the 11 kg (24 lb) lamps had fallen off their poles, and at least 161 were drooping. All 17,000 lamps needed to be checked and have the faulty adaptors replaced. All of the adaptors were removed by February 2024 at a cost of about $6 million.

== Environmental concerns ==
In modern times communities in New Zealand have turned their street lights off for multiple reasons including to save energy, reduce light pollution and help protect local wildlife.

For example, in 2003 Dunedin City Council decided to turn street lights off 15 minutes earlier in the morning and turn them on 15 minutes later in the evening, in an effort to save power.

=== Light pollution ===
Light pollution from street lights, signs and other sources is an increasing problem around the world. DarkSky International recommends that street lights should be 3,000 K (kelvin) or less, but at least 77 per cent of street lighting in New Zealand is cool, blue-white LEDs with a colour temperature of 4,000 K. Conversion to LED lighting was funded by the NZ Transport Association and 4,000 K became the norm. Researchers from the Nelson Marlborough Institute of Technology found that light pollution in New Zealand increased by 37.4 per cent from 2012 to 2021. A number of places in New Zealand have made efforts to reduce light pollution and have chosen lighting between 3000 K and 2200 K LED.

The Aoraki Mackenzie International Dark Sky Reserve is an area of 4,367 km^{2} (1,686 sq mi) that was designated as an International Dark Sky Reserve in 2012. The reserve is located in the Mackenzie District in the South Island of New Zealand and includes the Aoraki / Mount Cook National Park and the Mackenzie Basin, Lake Pukaki and Lake Tekapo. The main settlements within the reserve are Mount Cook Village, Twizel, and Lake Tekapo. The low level of light pollution in the reserve area has been supported by a lighting by-law that was included in the Mackenzie District Plan in 1981. Low-pressure sodium lights were used for most street lights to reduce light pollution, but in 2017 it was announced that most street lights would be replaced with LED fittings, which were said to produce less light pollution, need less maintenance and be more energy efficient.

=== Wildlife concerns ===
The Westland petrel is a migratory bird which arrives each March from South America to breed along an 8 km (5.0 mi) stretch of coastal forest near Punakaiki, a village on the West Coast. Fledging petrels sometimes dive onto the road, attracted by street lights. Local people believed that the problem got worse after blue-white LED lights were installed in 2019, since the birds mistake the blue lights for bioluminescent fish. In 2020 NZ Transport Authority agreed to turn off 15 streetlights along a 3.4 km stretch of State Highway 6 during the fledging season, which appeared to reduce the number of birds injured by crashing on to the road.

In 2023, NIWA announced the results of a four-year project to determine whether LED lighting affected flying freshwater insects. Researchers found that streetlight intensity and colour spectrum influenced insect attraction to the lights. Many flying insect species "were more attracted to blue-white LEDs that emitted more blue light (a higher colour temperature), or to those that emitted no blue light (yellow LED), than the commonly installed [dimmer] 4,000 K LED streetlights". Researchers were surprised that "conversion from HPS [high-pressure sodium] streetlights to 4,000 K LED generally reduced insect attraction". In another study, bat scientists experimented with 4,000 K LED floodlights illuminating trees and discovered that local critically endangered long-tailed bats avoided the area when lit. Popular theory says that night-time light attracts insects, which attract bats, but as the NIWA study showed, insects were not particularly attracted to this type of light.

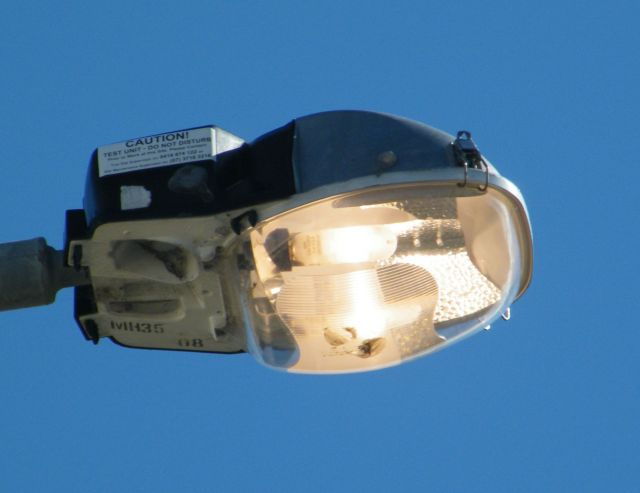
Sylvania Suburban glowing in daytime

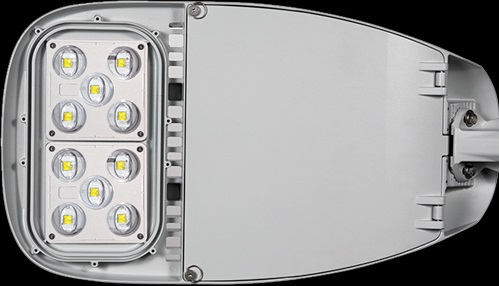
Cree XSP street light

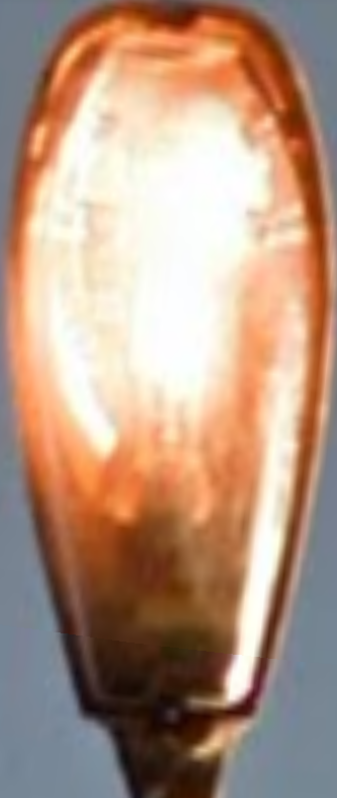
Betacom GL500

== See also ==
- Dark sky movement in New Zealand
