= Martinborough =

Town in the North Island of New Zealand

Martinborough Wharekaka (Māori)
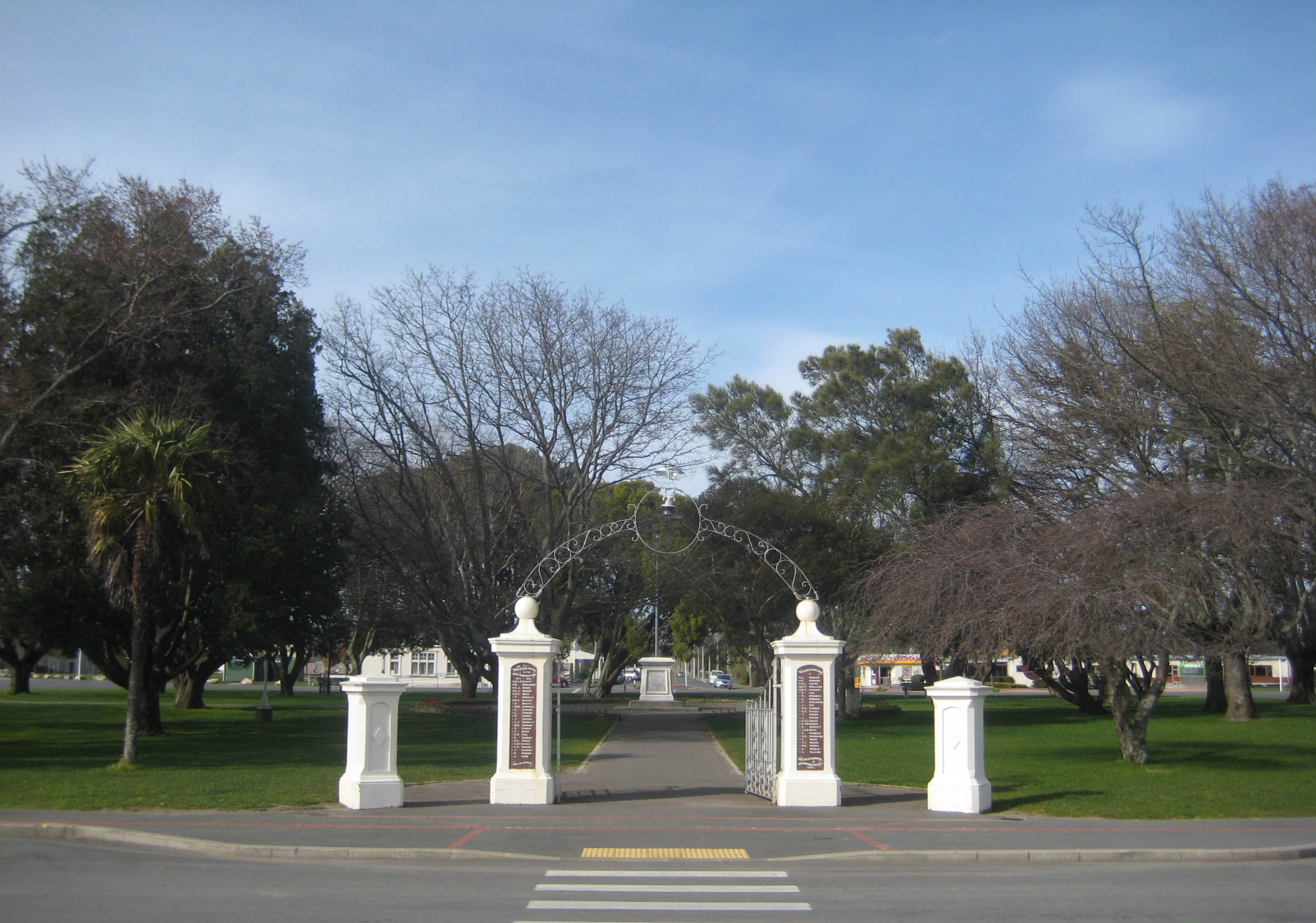
- Martinborough's Memorial Square
- Interactive map of Martinborough
- Coordinates: 41°13′8″S 175°27′33″E
- Region: Wellington Region
- Territorial authority: South Wairarapa District
- Ward: Martinborough Ward
- Community: Martinborough Community
- Electorates: Wairarapa; Ikaroa-Rāwhiti (Māori)

Government
  - Territorial Authority: South Wairarapa District Council
  - Regional council: Greater Wellington Regional Council
  - Mayor of South Wairarapa: Fran Wilde
  - Wairarapa MP: TBD
  - Ikaroa-Rāwhiti MP: Cushla Tangaere-Manuel

Area
  - Total: 4.86 km^{2} (1.88 sq mi)

Population (June 2025)
  - Total: 1,900
  - Density: 390/km^{2} (1,000/sq mi)
- Time zone: UTC+12 (NZST)
  - Summer (DST): UTC+13 (NZDT)
- Postcode(s): 5711
- Area code: 06

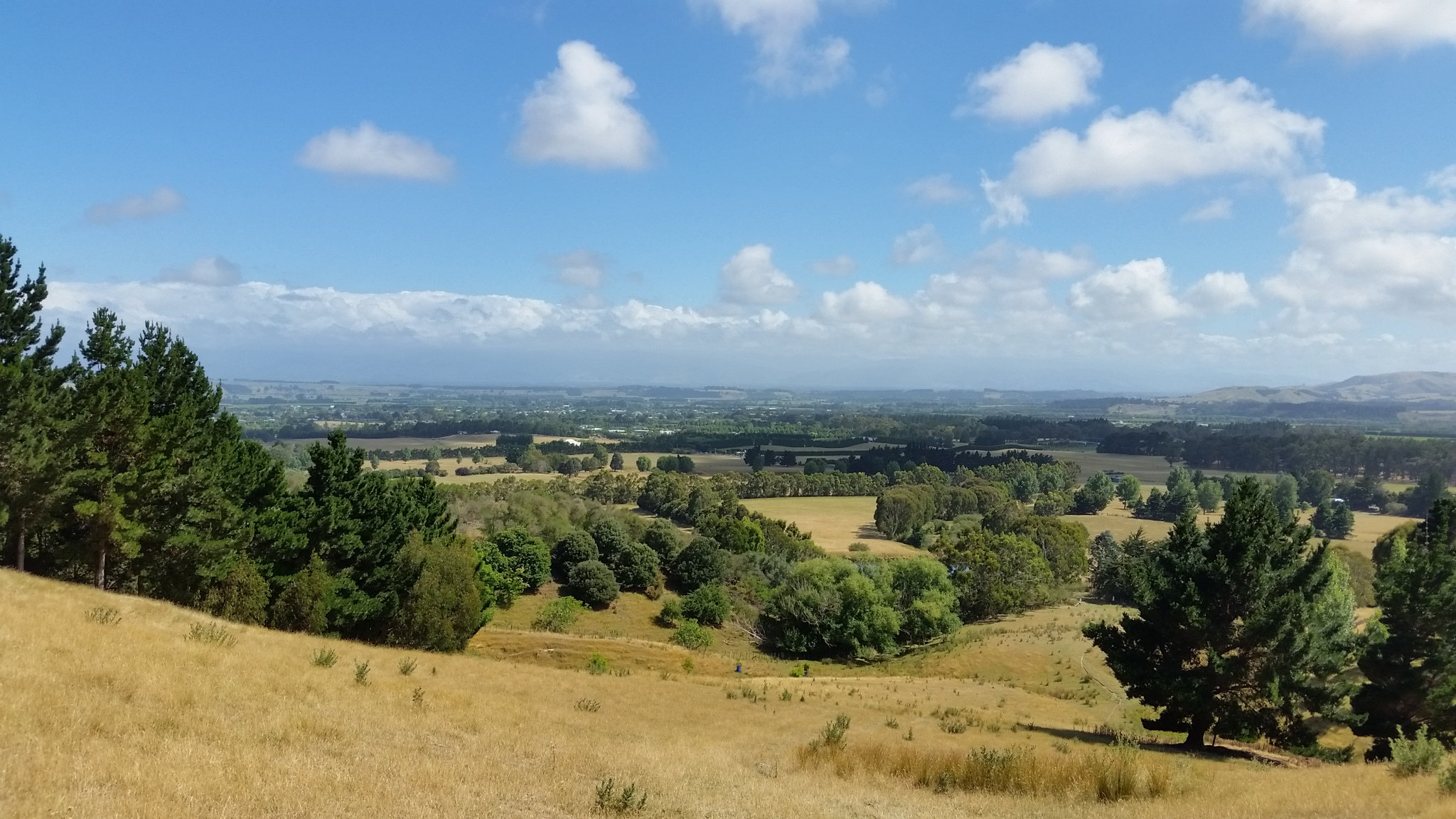
Martinborough township and surroundings viewed from near the top of Rapaki Hill

Martinborough (Māori: Wharekaka or Māori: Huangarua) is a town in the South Wairarapa District, in the Wellington region of New Zealand's North Island. It is 65 kilometres east of Wellington and 35 kilometres south-west of Masterton. The town has a resident population of 1,900 (June 2025).

The town is home to the South Wairarapa District Council.

== History and culture ==
=== European settlement ===
John Martin is regarded as the town's founder and set out the first streets in the pattern of the Union Flag in the 19th century. Before Martinborough was established the southern part of the region was known as Waihenga, a point that seems to be lost at times in the history of the district. A feature is the colonial architecture, one example of which is the historic Martinborough Hotel, built in 1882.

Prior to the expansion of viticulture, Martinborough was largely a rural service town for nearby farms.

=== Mayors of Martinborough Borough Council ===
The mayor of Martinborough officiated over the Martinborough Borough of New Zealand, which was administered by the Martinborough Borough Council. The office existed from 1928 until 1989, when Martinborough Borough alongside Greytown and Featherston boroughs also with Featherston County was amalgamated into the South Wairarapa District Council as part of the 1989 local government reforms.

	Name	Term
1	W.B. Martin	1928–1938
2	C.W.F. Skill	1938–1941
3	C.R. Holmes	1941–1946
4	J. Martin	1946–1953
5	L.A. Campbell	1953–1965
6	S.H. Ussher	1965–1973
7	Dawson Wright	1973–1989

=== Marae ===
The local Hau Ariki Marae and Te Whare Wananga o Tupai meeting house are affiliated with the Ngāti Kahungunu hapū of Ngāti Hikawera o Kahungunu.

In October 2020, the Government committed $371,332 from the Provincial Growth Fund to upgrade the marae, and create 37 jobs.

== Demographics ==
Stats NZ describes Martinborough as a small urban area, which covers 4.86 km^{2} (1.88 sq mi). It had an estimated population of 1,900 as of June 2025, with a population density of 391 people per km^{2}.

Historical population
Year	Pop.	±% p.a.
2006	1,329	—
2013	1,494	+1.69%
2018	1,824	+4.07%
2023	1,875	+0.55%
The 2006 population is for a smaller area of 4.50 km^{2}. Source:

Martinborough had a population of 1,875 in the 2023 New Zealand census, an increase of 51 people (2.8%) since the 2018 census, and an increase of 381 people (25.5%) since the 2013 census. There were 912 males, 954 females, and 9 people of other genders in 828 dwellings. 3.8% of people identified as LGBTIQ+. The median age was 52.2 years (compared with 38.1 years nationally). There were 279 people (14.9%) aged under 15 years, 198 (10.6%) aged 15 to 29, 837 (44.6%) aged 30 to 64, and 558 (29.8%) aged 65 or older.

People could identify as more than one ethnicity. The results were 86.1% European (Pākehā); 17.0% Māori; 2.9% Pasifika; 4.8% Asian; 0.8% Middle Eastern, Latin American and African New Zealanders (MELAA); and 3.5% other, which includes people giving their ethnicity as "New Zealander". English was spoken by 97.1%, Māori by 2.9%, Samoan by 0.3%, and other languages by 9.1%. No language could be spoken by 2.2% (e.g. too young to talk). New Zealand Sign Language was known by 0.3%. The percentage of people born overseas was 20.6, compared with 28.8% nationally.

Religious affiliations were 25.3% Christian, 0.5% Hindu, 1.3% Māori religious beliefs, 2.1% Buddhist, 0.6% New Age, 0.2% Jewish, and 0.6% other religions. People who answered that they had no religion were 63.2%, and 6.1% of people did not answer the census question.

Of those at least 15 years old, 474 (29.7%) people had a bachelor's or higher degree, 771 (48.3%) had a post-high school certificate or diploma, and 354 (22.2%) people exclusively held high school qualifications. The median income was $44,100, compared with $41,500 nationally. 279 people (17.5%) earned over $100,000 compared to 12.1% nationally. The employment status of those at least 15 was 759 (47.6%) full-time, 234 (14.7%) part-time, and 33 (2.1%) unemployed.

== Economy ==
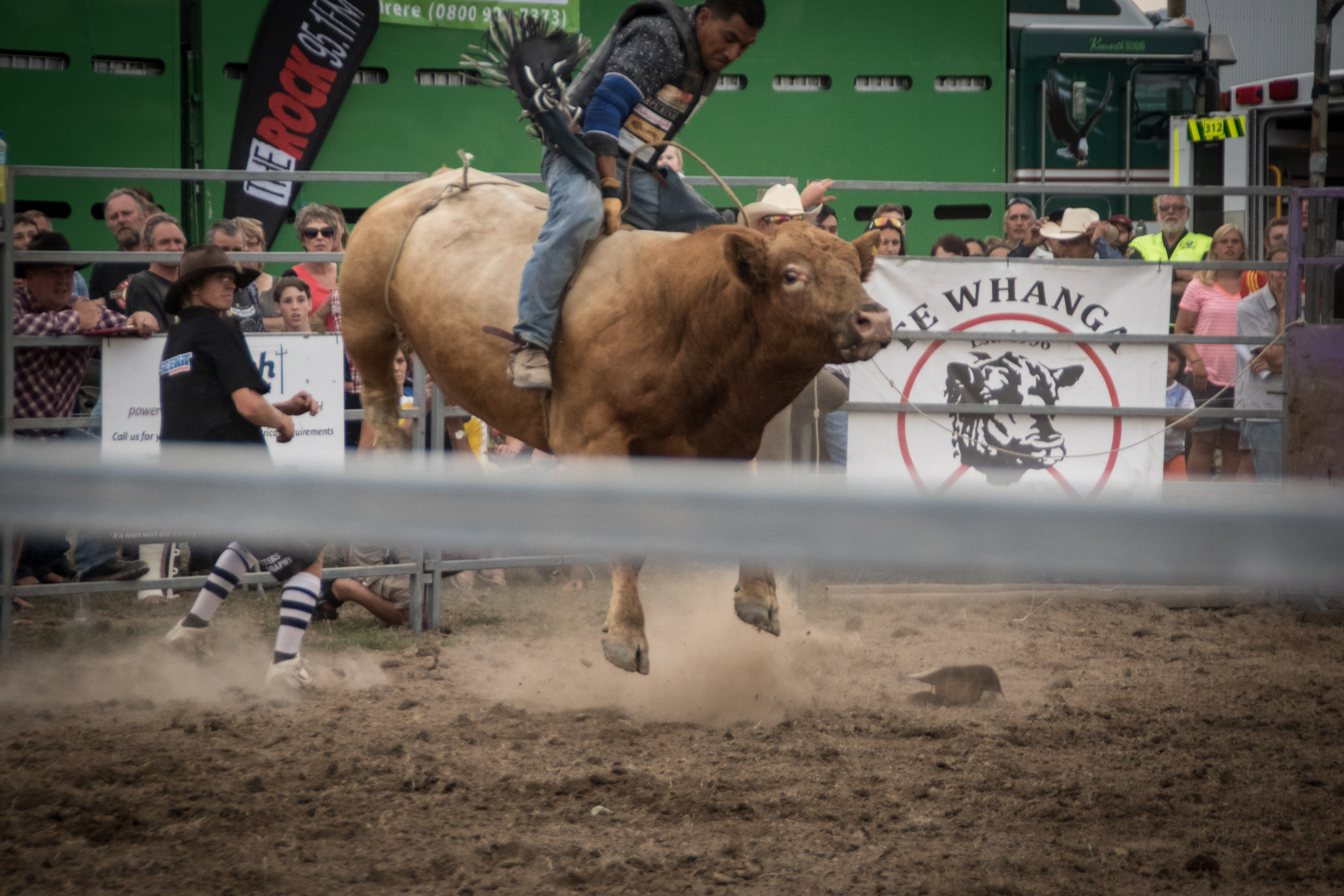
Martinborough Rodeo 2016

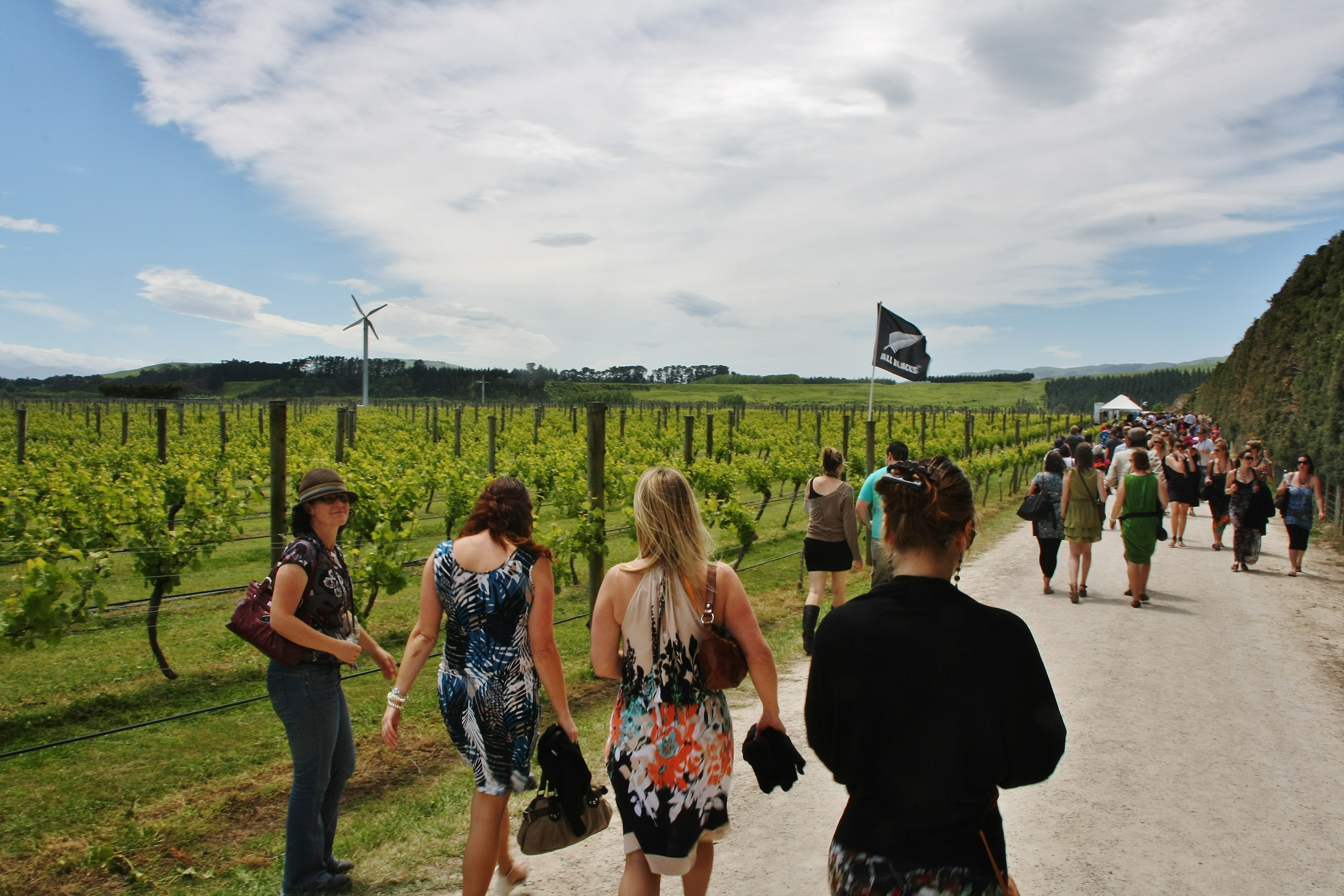
Mustering Toast Martinborough 2011

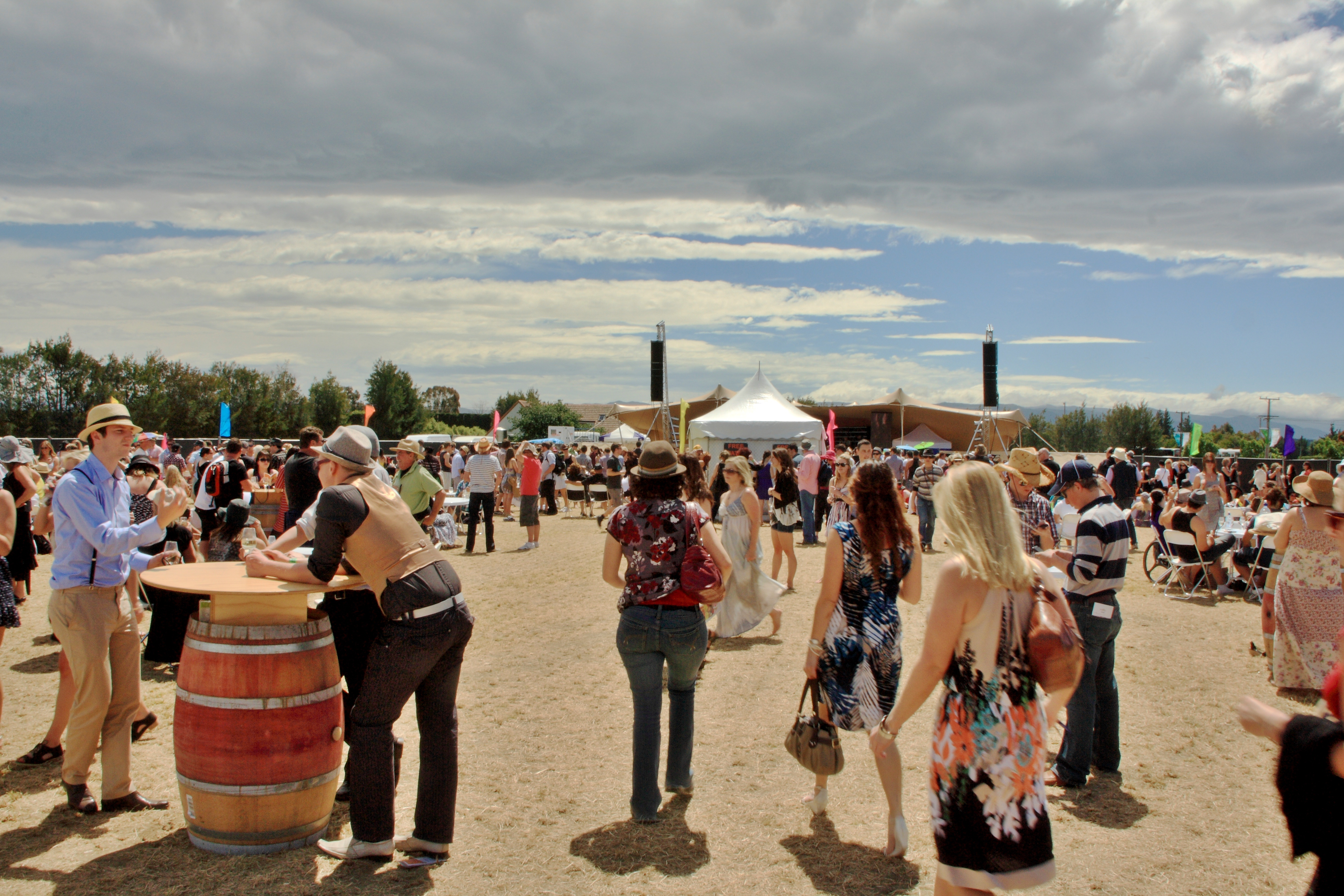
Flocked Toast Martinborough 2011

Martinborough has a large number of vineyards producing wines, notably Pinot noir. Martinborough has a warm micro-climate, with hills to the east and west. Almost all the vineyards are in thin ribbons around the northern and eastern sides of the town, and on the Dry River to the south. All follow dry riverbeds, which provide appropriate soils for viticulture.

Notable wineries include Schubert Wines, Te Kairanga, Tirohana Estate, Palliser Estate Wines, Dry River, Martinborough Vineyard, Murdoch James, Ata Rangi, Craggy Range, Tiwaiwaka, Haythornthwaite, and Escarpment. During November, the region's wines are celebrated in the Toast Martinborough wine festival. This event temporarily enlarges the population by 10,000.

Other industries around Martinborough focus on traditional beef and sheep farming; growing olives, lavender and nuts; and fishing at the coast settlements of Ngawi and Cape Palliser. Tourism is an important industry for the town, and the Martinborough i-site provides advice about accommodation, activities, wineries and where to eat. Several wineries and specialist tour operators offer vineyard tours, and the Martinborough Brewery is also located in town.

== Dark Sky Reserve ==
In January 2023, an area of 3,665 square kilometres (1,415 sq mi), was certified as the Wairarapa Dark Sky Reserve by the International Dark-Sky Association. The area covered by the reserve includes the Aorangi Forest Park, and the South Wairarapa and Carterton Districts. Martinborough was the location for the first public meeting to discuss the proposal to apply for dark sky accreditation, and the town is approximately in the centre of the reserve. The Wairarapa Dark Sky Reserve was the second dark sky reserve to be certified in New Zealand (after the Aoraki Mackenzie International Dark Sky Reserve was recognised in 2012). The certification of the new dark sky reserve was the result of 5 years of volunteer work by the Wairarapa Dark Sky Reserve Association and local partner organisations.

== Education ==
Martinborough School is a co-educational state primary school for Year 1 to 8 students, with a roll of 245 as of July 2026. It started in 1872 as Wharekaka School, became Waihinga School, then in 1898 Martinborough School. By 1921 it was Martinborough District High School, and when that merged with other district high schools to form Kuranui College in 1960, it became Martinborough School again.

The nearest high school is Kuranui College.

The international cooking school Le Cordon Bleu and UCOL considered establishing a campus in Martinborough by 2009. They eventually opted to open a campus in Wellington instead, disappointing locals who were hoping it would provide an economic boost to the town.

== Climate ==
Climate data for Martinborough (1991–2020 normals, extremes 1968–1969, 1986–present)
Month	Jan	Feb	Mar	Apr	May	Jun	Jul	Aug	Sep	Oct	Nov	Dec	Year
Record high °C (°F)	34.2 (93.6)	34.1 (93.4)	31.0 (87.8)	28.2 (82.8)	23.8 (74.8)	21.1 (70.0)	19.2 (66.6)	20.6 (69.1)	26.0 (78.8)	26.2 (79.2)	30.7 (87.3)	31.3 (88.3)	34.2 (93.6)
Mean maximum °C (°F)	30.3 (86.5)	29.6 (85.3)	27.2 (81.0)	23.5 (74.3)	20.7 (69.3)	17.7 (63.9)	16.6 (61.9)	17.9 (64.2)	20.1 (68.2)	22.3 (72.1)	25.3 (77.5)	27.8 (82.0)	31.7 (89.1)
Mean daily maximum °C (°F)	23.6 (74.5)	23.7 (74.7)	21.6 (70.9)	18.5 (65.3)	15.9 (60.6)	13.3 (55.9)	12.7 (54.9)	13.7 (56.7)	15.4 (59.7)	17.1 (62.8)	19.1 (66.4)	21.5 (70.7)	18.0 (64.4)
Daily mean °C (°F)	17.9 (64.2)	17.8 (64.0)	15.9 (60.6)	13.1 (55.6)	10.9 (51.6)	8.6 (47.5)	8.1 (46.6)	8.9 (48.0)	10.6 (51.1)	12.2 (54.0)	13.9 (57.0)	16.4 (61.5)	12.9 (55.1)
Mean daily minimum °C (°F)	12.2 (54.0)	11.9 (53.4)	10.2 (50.4)	7.8 (46.0)	5.9 (42.6)	3.9 (39.0)	3.4 (38.1)	4.2 (39.6)	5.9 (42.6)	7.3 (45.1)	8.7 (47.7)	11.2 (52.2)	7.7 (45.9)
Mean minimum °C (°F)	4.7 (40.5)	4.4 (39.9)	2.9 (37.2)	0.7 (33.3)	−1.4 (29.5)	−2.5 (27.5)	−2.5 (27.5)	−1.8 (28.8)	−1.2 (29.8)	−0.3 (31.5)	1.3 (34.3)	3.6 (38.5)	−3.2 (26.2)
Record low °C (°F)	1.2 (34.2)	1.8 (35.2)	0.6 (33.1)	−2.1 (28.2)	−3.9 (25.0)	−4.3 (24.3)	−4.3 (24.3)	−4.0 (24.8)	−3.1 (26.4)	−1.8 (28.8)	−1.2 (29.8)	−1.6 (29.1)	−4.3 (24.3)
Average rainfall mm (inches)	45.2 (1.78)	52.2 (2.06)	50.3 (1.98)	62.4 (2.46)	62.7 (2.47)	81.9 (3.22)	86.8 (3.42)	71.4 (2.81)	59.9 (2.36)	69.7 (2.74)	66.3 (2.61)	58.8 (2.31)	767.6 (30.22)
Mean monthly sunshine hours	234.9	198.1	194.5	152.0	127.4	95.4	104.2	138.7	168.6	195.2	222.4	203.1	2,034.5
Source: NIWA

== Notable residents ==
- John Martin - politician, runholder, and founder of Martinborough
- Eric Ramsden - journalist and author
