= Kawarau Gibbston Dark Sky Park =

Dark sky preserve in New Zealand

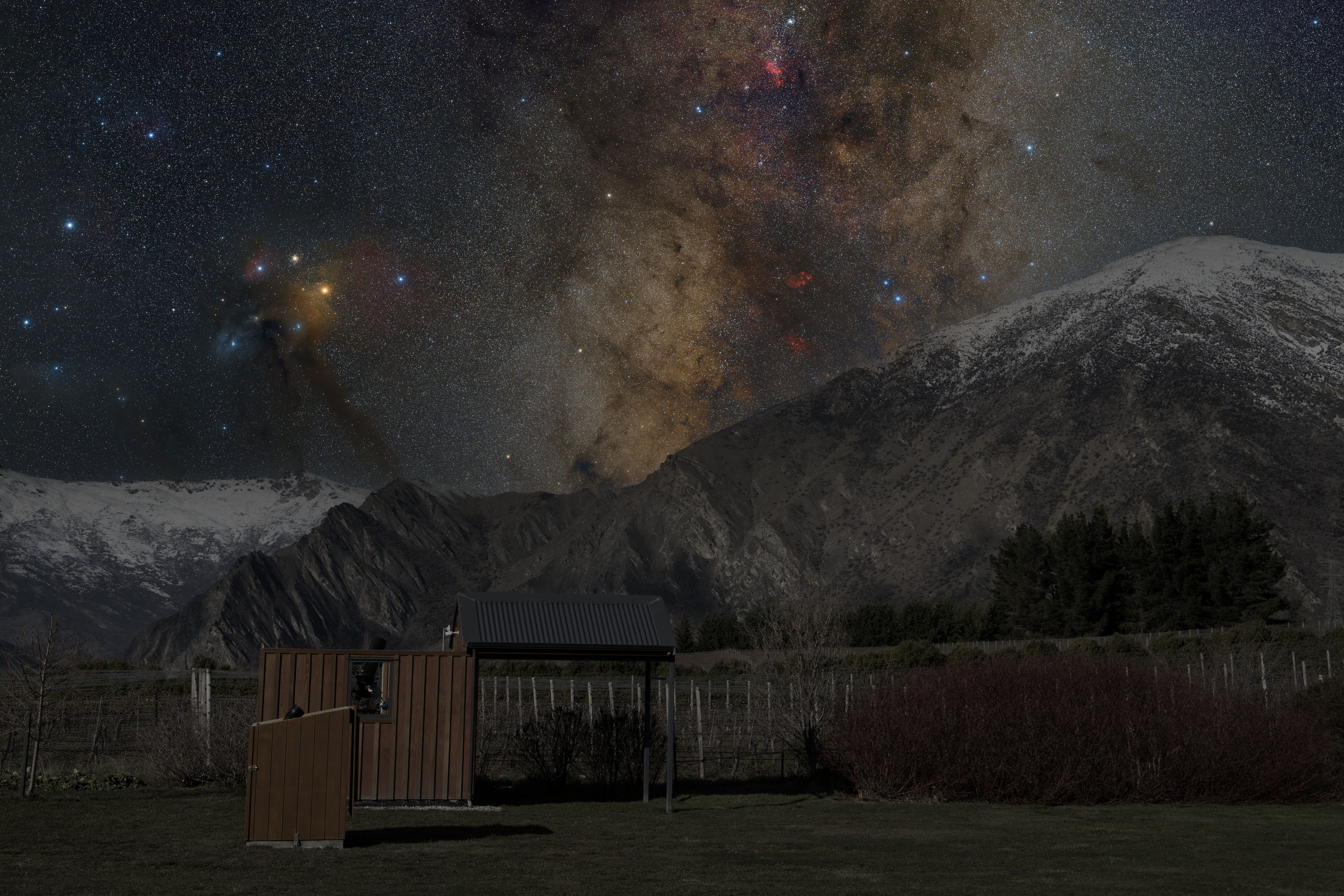
- Milky Way rising over Nevis Bluff, from Antimony Observatory
- Interactive map of Kawarau Gibbston Dark Sky Park
- Location: Queenstown-Lakes District, New Zealand
- Nearest town: Queenstown
- Coordinates: 45°01′32″S 168°57′23″E
- Area: 25 km^{2} (9.7 sq mi)
- Designated: 2024
- Operator: Gibbston Community Association
- Website: gibbstondarksky.com

The Kawarau Gibbston Dark Sky Park is a dark-sky preserve located between Cromwell and Queenstown in the Queenstown-Lakes District in the South Island of New Zealand. It covers an area of 25 km^{2} (9.7 sq mi) along a section of the Kawarau River, and is centred on the small community of Gibbston. The Kawarau Gibbston Dark Sky Park was accredited as an International Dark Sky Park by DarkSky International in May 2024. It is the first dark sky preserve to be accredited in the Otago Region, the seventh dark sky preserve in New Zealand, and the third International Dark Sky Park in the country (after Wai-iti Dark Sky Park and Oxford Forest Conservation Area).

The Kawarau Gibbston Dark Sky Park is located in a valley and shielded from light pollution by high mountains, leading to a particularly dark night sky. Central regions of the Magellanic Clouds and the Milky Way galaxy can be readily viewed and photographed, as well as the Aurora Australis.

The application for the dark sky park accreditation was prepared by a volunteer group, the Gibbston Community Association. The lead author for the application was Brian Boyle, an astrophysicist who moved to the Queenstown-Lakes District at the end of 2019. The application reports that night sky luminance in the park is 21.75 mag/arcsec^{2} (corresponding to Bortle scale 2 and on the threshold of Bortle scale 1).

The Gibbston Community Association is a registered charity in New Zealand. The association advocates for the protection of the dark sky, promotes good lighting practices and is introducing a voluntary certification code for lighting of homes and businesses. The association hopes to work with nearby communities at Lowburn, Bannockburn and Cardrona to expand the dark sky preserve to include the Remarkables and Pisa conservation areas.

== See also ==
- Dark sky movement in New Zealand
