= Graeme Murray (entrepreneur) =

New Zealand astro-tourism promoter

Graeme Douglas Murray MNZM, JP
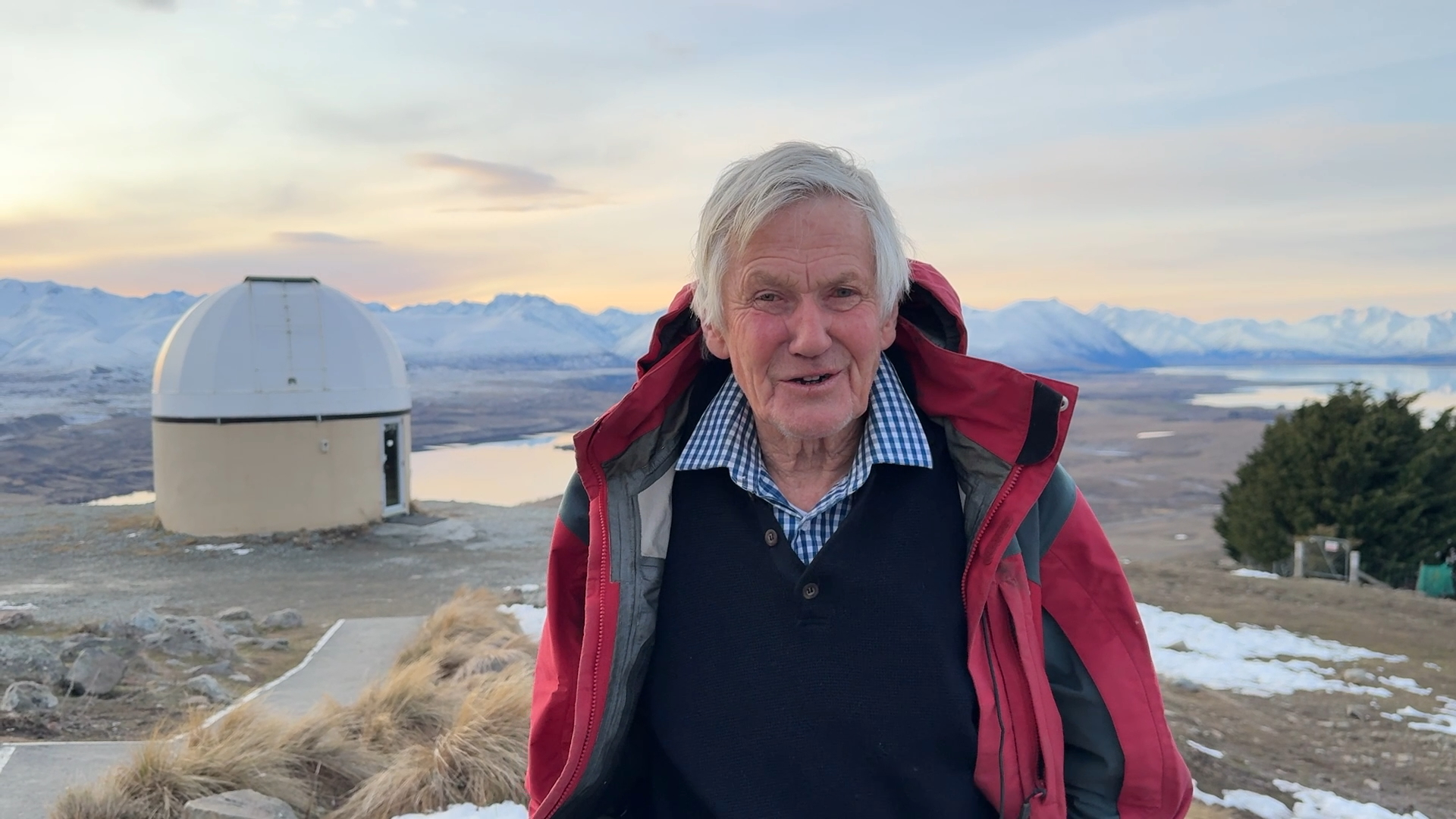
- Murray in August 2024 on Mount John
- Born: 20 December 1943 (age 81); Temuka, New Zealand
- Known for: Advocacy for dark sky preservation in New Zealand; co-founding Earth & Sky Ltd; contributing to the establishment of the Aoraki Mackenzie International Dark Sky Reserve
- Honours: MNZM

Graeme Douglas Murray is a New Zealand tourism entrepreneur known for his role in the establishment of the Aoraki Mackenzie International Dark Sky Reserve.

== Biography ==
Murray was born in Temuka, Canterbury, New Zealand.

Murray was manager of Dalgety Travel in Timaru from 1963 to 1974. He later served as general manager of Lynn River Products Ltd in Geraldine from 1974 to 1977. In 1977, with Malcolm Prouting and Richard Rayward, he co-founded Air Safaris, and managed its sales and administration until 2001.

=== Astro-tourism ===
In the late 1990s, Murray co-founded Earth & Sky (now known as the Dark Sky Project) with Hide Ozawa, focusing on education, environmental awareness, science and astrotourism. They contributed funds towards constructing the new observatory building at Mt John Observatory, hosting the 1.8m MOA Telescope, refurbished and installed a modern telescope in an unused observatory, and constructed a conservatory-like café. Initially operating from a caravan, the company grew to attract tens of thousands of visitors annually.

Earth & Sky offered guided stargazing tours of the University of Canterbury’s Mount John Observatory. According to a 2015 report by the International Dark-Sky Association (IDA), Earth & Sky attracted approximately 75,000 visitors per year.

Murray and Ozawa later secured land on the shore of Lake Tekapo from the Mackenzie District Council to develop an astronomy centre, including restoration of the Brashear Telescope.

In 2016, Earth & Sky Ltd, entered a joint venture with Ngāi Tahu Tourism, who described it as the longstanding vision of Graeme Murray and Hide Ozawa. The partnership aimed to integrate mātauranga Māori with scientific astronomy, including through the development of the 'Rehua' building and a multimedia night sky experience guided by local rūnanga.

Following the joint venture, Earth & Sky rebranded as the Dark Sky Project, in 2019.

== Observatory support ==
In 2004, Earth & Sky Ltd and the University of Canterbury jointly funded a new building to house the 1.8-metre Microlensing Observations in Astrophysics (MOA) telescope. In exchange, Earth & Sky Ltd received exclusive tourism access to Mount John Observatory.

In 2015, Murray oversaw the recovery and restoration of the Brashear Telescope, an 18-inch refractor built in the 1890s now installed at the Dark Sky Project’s Astronomy Centre in Lake Tekapo.

== Dark Sky advocacy ==
Murray was inspired by a conversation with Ozawa, where Ozawa said, “You New Zealanders take your stars for granted! [...] If we had a sky like this in Japan, we would create a park to protect it.” Murray attended the 2007 UNESCO Starlight Conference in La Palma, to pursue formal protection of the Mackenzie region's night sky. On his return, he helped form the Aoraki Mackenzie Starlight Group, chaired by former Minister of Internal Affairs, Margaret Austin and worked with councils, academic institutions, and tourism operators. The Aoraki Mackenzie International Dark Sky Reserve was established in 2012, as the third dark sky reserve in the world, and the first to be awarded Gold Tier status by the International Dark-Sky Association.

== Recognition ==
Murray was acknowledged in the 2015 Aoraki Mackenzie International Dark Sky Reserve Annual Report for his role in promoting night sky awareness and supporting tourism in the region.

In 2015, he was appointed a Member of the New Zealand Order of Merit for services to tourism and dark sky preservation.

In 2024, he received the Forsyth Barr Special Commendation at the South Canterbury Business and Community Excellence Awards.

In 2025, Murray’s contributions were noted in media coverage of the 20th anniversary of astro-tourism in Tekapo.

== Community involvement ==
Murray has served as a Justice of the Peace and marriage celebrant. He held governance roles in local tourism and education, including twenty years with the South Canterbury Regional Development Council and fourteen years with the Mackenzie Tourism and Development Board.
