= Dark sky movement in New Zealand =

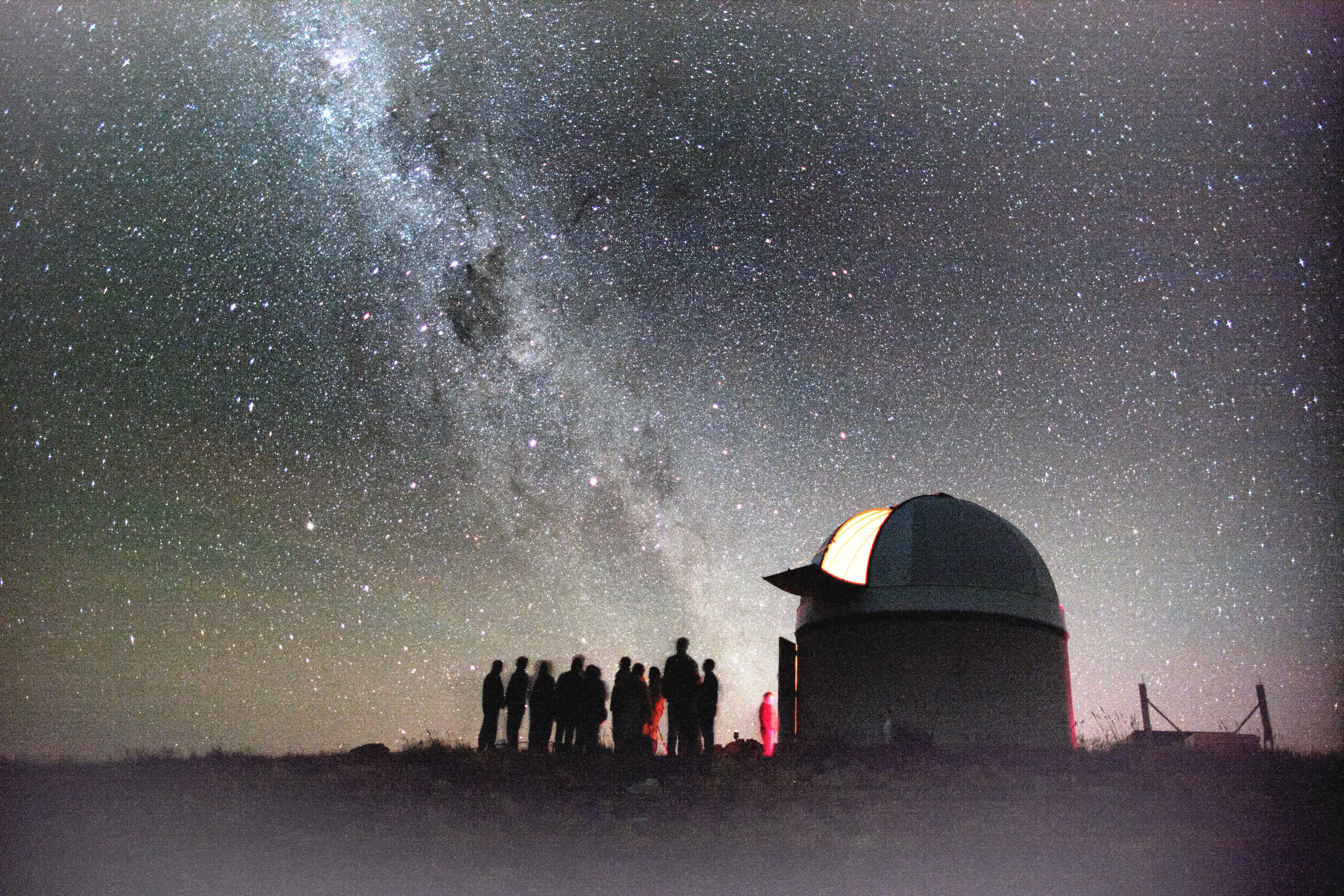
Visitors at Mt John Observatory, near Lake Tekapo

The dark-sky movement in New Zealand is a range of projects and initiatives to reduce light pollution, enhance the visibility of the night sky, promote astrotourism and encourage people to become interested in the stars. It includes projects to seek certification of regions of New Zealand that meet DarkSky International standards for the night sky, including the control of artificial light and light pollution. New Zealand's first certified Dark Sky place was the Aoraki Mackenzie International Dark Sky Reserve, accredited in 2012. Several other dark sky places have now been certified, and the movement has an objective of achieving accreditation of New Zealand as a Dark Sky Nation, where the entire country has received certification for its protection of the night sky.

To achieve certification, standards for control of light pollution from artificial light sources will need to be introduced or strengthened across the country. Advocates for the dark sky movement in New Zealand have proposed that there should be national legislation to control light pollution, following similar laws already introduced in France, Great Britain and Slovenia. In 2026, advocates for the dark sky movement in New Zealand raised concerns that changes to national planning laws would prevent local councils from enacting measures to protect the night sky, leading to a critical risk to the accreditation of dark sky places.

== Visibility of the natural night sky ==
The World Atlas of Artificial Sky Luminance has shown that over 80% of the world population, and more than 99% of the European and U.S. populations are exposed to significant light pollution when viewing the night sky. Over one-third of the world's population cannot see the Milky Way. Around half of the land area of the United States and 88% of Europe's land area has light-polluted night skies. Between 2012 and 2016, areas around the globe that were continuously illuminated increased in brightness at a rate of 2.2% annually, and the total illuminated area grew by the same amount.

In contrast, illuminated areas in New Zealand grew by only 1% per annum in brightness. A study of artificial night sky brightness in New Zealand in 2014 found that 74% of the land area of the North Island and 93% of the South Island had either truly dark night skies, or were degraded only at the horizon. Further, in 2019, 2.4% of New Zealand was within a certified dark sky area, compared with 0.1% globally. Nevertheless, in almost all major urban areas in New Zealand, the level of artificial brightness prevented observers from seeing the natural night sky.

== In Māori culture ==
The ability to see the natural night sky has great significance in Māori culture. A New Zealand professor of Mātauranga Māori (Māori knowledge), Rangi Mātāmua says:

Looking at the sky and connecting to it sits at the heart of humanity. It's one of the earliest activities every single culture on the planet did, and the night sky is intrinsically connected to who we are as humans.

The Polynesian ancestors of Māori people undertook long ocean voyages, reaching Fiji, Tonga and Samoa between 1,100 and 800 BCE. Knowledge of the stars was a key tool for ocean navigation without compass or sextants.

In Māori culture, Matariki is the Pleiades star cluster and a celebration of its first dawn rising in late June or early July. The rising marks the beginning of the new year in the Māori lunar calendar. Celebration of Matariki underwent a revival in the early 1990s. Matariki was first celebrated as an official public holiday in New Zealand on 24 June 2022.

== Education and research ==
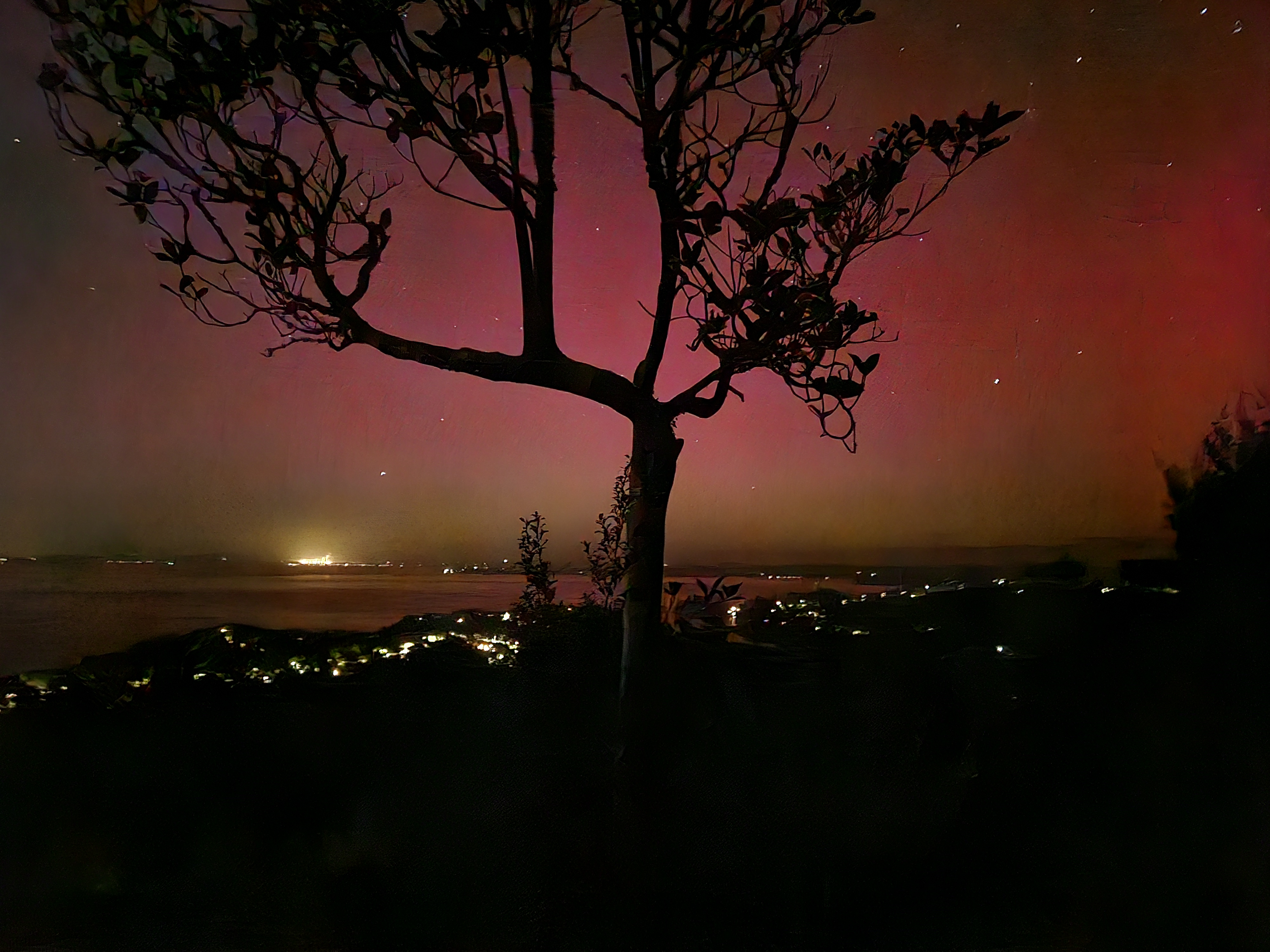
The aurora australis during the May 2024 solar storms in New Zealand, seen from Mount Atkinson, Titirangi

Education and research are benefits of Dark Sky places. Visitors learn both facts and legends about the night sky and have the opportunity to view the stars through telescopes. Due to its latitude and longitude, New Zealand is an important location for astronomical observation. It fills in gaps between Hawaiian and Australian observatories as the Earth rotates, and the South Island is "one of the only land masses outside of Antarctica from which the Aurora Australis can be seen and studied". The initiative is led by the Dark Sky Network, and is supported by the Royal Astronomical Society of New Zealand. As of 2021, New Zealand had 30 astronomical observatories. Protection of the night sky is essential to the functioning of these observatories, which offer research and public engagement with astronomy.

Professor John Hearnshaw believes that increasing young people's interest in astronomy would attract more students to study STEM subjects, which has economic benefits for New Zealand. He states that New Zealand has more amateur astronomers per capita than any other country, many of whom are school students. Astrotourism and Dark Sky places would increase interest in astronomy and the night sky.

== Benefits for wildlife ==
While the main objective of Dark Sky places is to preserve the visibility of stars in the night sky, there are benefits for wildlife when night-time illumination is reduced.

One example is the Hutton's shearwater in Kaikōura. This bird flies into and out of its breeding colonies in the hours of darkness, and can be disoriented by bright lights at night. This has led to problems with adult and newly fledged birds crash-landing in the streets of Kaikōura at night. The young birds are usually unable to take off again, making them vulnerable to being run over by vehicles or succumbing to predation by dogs or cats. Over two successive nights in 2015, 200 birds were found crash-landed in the town. Kaikōura District Council modified the town's street lighting to reduce the risk to the birds, and the district was accredited as a Dark Sky Sanctuary in 2024. As part of the implementation of the sanctuary, and to protect the Hutton's shearwater, the NZ Transport Agency agreed to change the street lighting on State Highway 1 through the town, using fully-shielded luminaires with a colour temperature of 2,200 K or 2,700 K. A staged programme of works to replace old lights began in April 2025.

Moths are vital to the ecosystem as they pollinate plants and provide food for other insects and birds, but their natural cycles can be disturbed by artificial lighting. Some moths and other insects are found only in the Mackenzie area. An endangered moth named Izatha psychra lives only in one area of shrub in the Aoraki Mackenzie Dark Sky Reserve and in the Oteake Conservation Park.

== Astrotourism ==
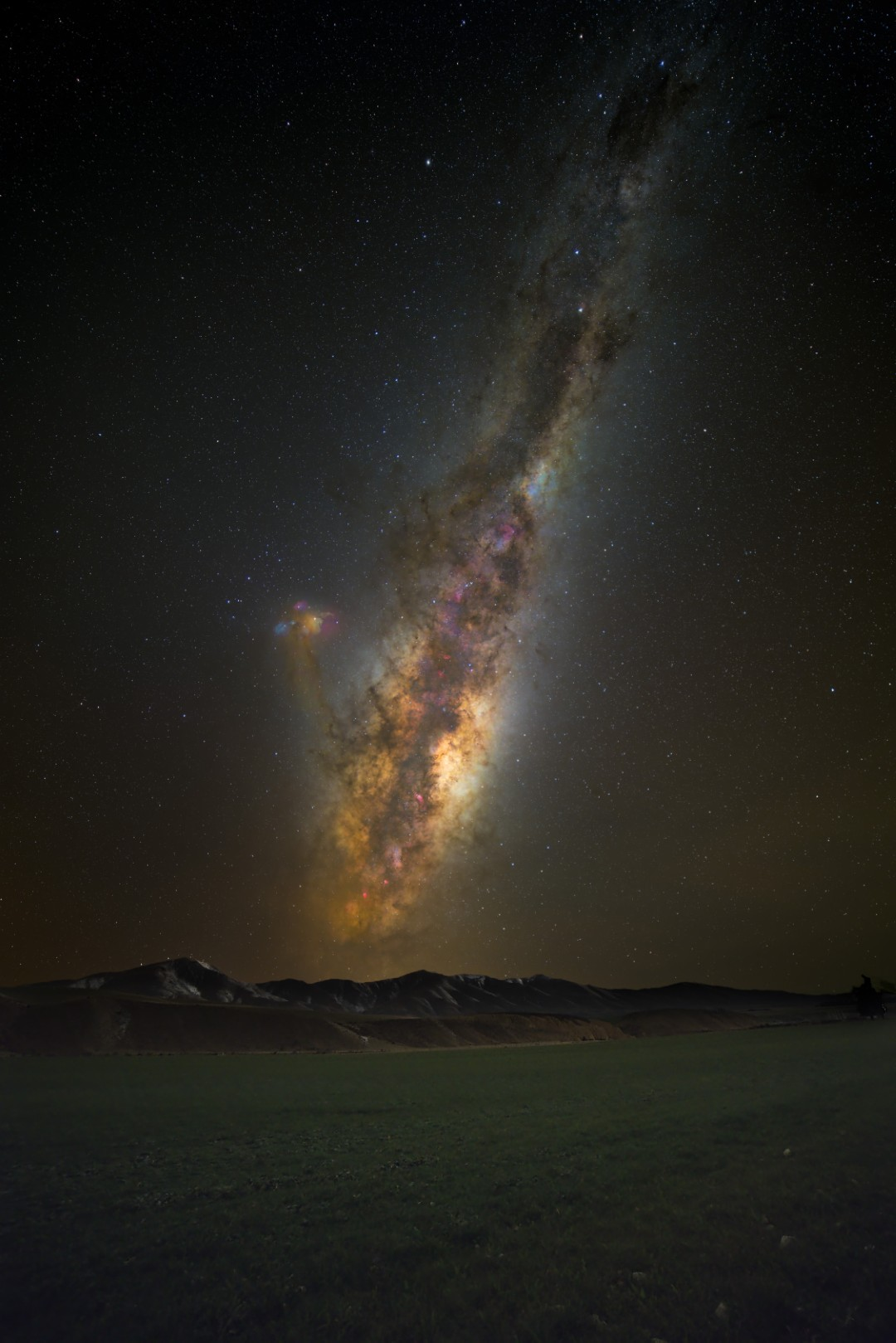
Milky Way galactic core from Little Kyeburn, close to Naseby, New Zealand

Many international tourists live in crowded and polluted cities where they cannot see stars in the night sky. Hide Ozawa, co-founder of Tekapo-based astrotourism company Dark Sky Project, believed that New Zealanders did not value their night sky enough, and said that in Japan a park would have been created to preserve the night sky. Ozawa was one of those who promoted the establishment of a Dark Sky Reserve in Mackenzie District.

New Zealand's first accredited Dark Sky place was the Aoraki Mackenzie International Dark Sky Reserve, which received accreditation from the International Dark Sky Association in 2012. By 2022 at least nine astrotourism companies were operating in the area, with daily visitor spending in the Mackenzie District rising from $120m per year in the years 2009–2012 to around $360m by the end of 2019. The dramatic and sudden growth in astrotourism led to some issues: some small rural towns such as Lake Tekapo began attracting more tourists than they could easily handle. The COVID-19 pandemic in 2020–2021 caused a collapse in the international tourism market, forcing astrotourism companies to lay off staff. Many of these staff were foreigners able to provide night-sky guiding and narration in languages other than English, and it was difficult for companies to find more knowledgeable multilingual staff after the pandemic. In 2021, in response to the shortage of guides, Nalayini Davies (president of the Royal Astronomical Society of New Zealand) and John Hearnshaw (Emeritus Professor of Astronomy at the University of Canterbury) set up a non-profit educational organisation called the Aotearoa Astrotourism Academy. Their aim was to train astrotourism night-sky guides in basic astronomy.

A 2023 report commissioned by Enterprise North Canterbury suggested that a dark sky reserve could create $4.6 million of (mainly domestic) visitor spending in Waimakariri. Enterprise North Canterbury was working with other regional organisations to develop a dark sky trail in Canterbury. The secretary of the Royal Astronomical Society of New Zealand stated that a national approach to astrotourism was needed so that regional organisations did not repeat work done elsewhere and suggested that the Department of Conservation might lead such an initiative.

In June 2024, then Tourism Minister Matt Doocey said that if New Zealand became a Dark Sky nation it might attract more international tourists interested in stargazing. Research by Tourism New Zealand showed that more than 70% of people considering visiting New Zealand had indicated an interest in stargazing. Tourism is a seasonal business but the best times for stargazing are during the shoulder and off-peak seasons, so astrotourism could provide economic benefits to rural tourist towns when they would not normally be busy.

In August 2024, Tourism New Zealand launched a campaign to promote astrotourism in conjunction with food experiences in New Zealand. An outdoor 'pop-up' restaurant event was held at Kura Tawhiti / Castle Hill in Canterbury for invited guests from New Zealand's main tourism markets (Australia, the United States and China) so that they could experience stargazing and fine dining together.

== National standards for control of light pollution ==
In 2023, John Hearnshaw petitioned the New Zealand Parliament to introduce national standards to minimise light pollution and promote dark skies. Some communities in New Zealand, including the existing certified dark sky places, already have local government by-laws or ordinances to curb light pollution. However, there are many proposals for additional dark sky places to be accredited, and the petition calls for national standards to avoid the need for individual councils to develop and implement their own local requirements. Hearnshaw's petition sought national standards that would include:

- acknowledging the adverse effects of artificial light at night on human health, flora, fauna, energy waste and the visibility of the night sky
- reducing the floodlighting of buildings including imposing curfews
- ensuring that the upward light ratio from any luminaire is less than 1 per cent
- reducing glare
- reducing blue light (colour temperature to be less than 3,000 K in towns, and less than 2,400 – 2,700 K in rural areas)
- banning light trespass
- banning or strictly controlling searchlights and lasers
- limiting illumination in towns to be less than 35 lux, and less than 10 lux in rural areas

== Risks to accreditation of dark sky places ==
In 2026, advocates for dark sky places raised concerns that changes to New Zealand's planning laws could pose a critical risk to the accreditation of existing dark sky places. The changes of most concern would remove any consideration of visual amenity and effects on landscapes when councils were considering planning approvals. The proposed changes were said to remove the ability of councils to enact provisions to protect the night sky.

== List of dark sky places in New Zealand ==
As of 2025, Darksky International issues certifications for five different types of dark sky preserve:

- International Dark Sky Sanctuary
- International Dark Sky Reserve
- International Dark Sky Park
- International Dark Sky Community
- Urban Night Sky Place

Name	Type	Region	Area (km2)	Designated	References
Aoraki Mackenzie International Dark Sky Reserve	Dark Sky Reserve	Mackenzie District	4,367	June 2012	
Aotea / Great Barrier Island	Dark Sky Sanctuary	Auckland Region	285	May 2021	
Kaikōura Dark Sky Sanctuary	Dark Sky Sanctuary	Kaikōura District	2,039	September 2024	
Kawarau Gibbston Dark Sky Park	Dark Sky Park	Queenstown-Lakes District	25	May 2024	
Naseby Dark Sky Community	Dark Sky Community	Central Otago District	8	September 2025	
Oxford Forest Conservation Area	Dark Sky Park	Waimakariri District	113.5	January 2024	
Stewart Island / Rakiura	Dark Sky Sanctuary	Southland District	1,746	January 2019	
Tāhuna Glenorchy Dark Sky Sanctuary	Dark Sky Sanctuary	Queenstown-Lakes District	2,150	February 2025	
Wai-iti Dark Sky Park	Dark Sky Park	Tasman District	1.35	July 2020	
Wairarapa Dark Sky Reserve	Dark Sky Reserve	Wairarapa	3,665	January 2023	

== Plans for Dark Sky Nation certification ==
At the New Zealand Starlight Conference held in Tekapo in September 2019, representatives of groups involved in dark sky places in New Zealand agreed to support a project to achieve Dark Sky Nation certification for the country. A Dark Sky Nation is a country that has received certification for its protection of the night sky. To achieve certification, standards for control of light pollution from artificial light sources will need to be introduced or strengthened across the country. Advocates for the dark sky movement in New Zealand have proposed that there should be national legislation to control light pollution, following similar laws already introduced in France, Great Britain and Slovenia.

== See also ==
- Dark-sky movement – Campaign against light pollution
- Street lights in New Zealand
