= Brian J. Boyle =

Scottish astrophysicist

Brian J. Boyle is a Scottish astrophysicist based in Sydney, Australia from 1996 to 2019, and in Queenstown, New Zealand from 2020. His primary research interests are in the fields of quasars, active galaxies and cosmology.

He was involved in a variety of leadership roles in Australia, including Director of the Australian Astronomical Observatory (1996 to 2003), Director of CSIRO Australia Telescope National Facility (2003 to 2009), CSIRO SKA Director (2009–2016), and Deputy Vice Chancellor (Enterprise) at the University of New South Wales (2016–2019). He was also involved in science-direction setting in Australia for over 15 years, contributing the mid-term review in 2000, leading the development of the Australian Astronomy Decadal Plan 2006–15, and facilitating the development of the Optical and Radio Astronomy Investment Plan for the National Collaborative Research Infrastructure Strategy in 2007.

He led the initial development of the Australian SKA Pathfinder Project and, as CSIRO SKA Director, helped secure co-hosting rights for the Square Kilometre Array telescope at the Murchison RadioAstronomy Observatory in Western Australia.

He was awarded the Centenary Medal for services to Australian Astronomy in 2003 and elected as a fellow of the Australian Academy of Science in 2006.

Since 2020, Boyle has been based in Queenstown New Zealand, where he has been involved in a number of environmental programmes. He chaired the Wai Whakaata/Lake Hayes steering committee and has been chair of the Winterstellar Charitable Trust from 2022. He led the successful application to have the Kawarau Gibbston Dark Sky Park accredited by DarkSky International in 2024.

== Education ==
Boyle attended school at Stewart's Melville College in Edinburgh, Scotland. He obtained a BSc in astrophysics from the University of Edinburgh in 1982 and a PhD from the Durham University in 1986. His thesis title was "The evolution and clustering of optically selected quasi-stellar objects."

== Career ==
Boyle was appointed to a variety of leadership roles in Australia, including Director of the Australian Astronomical Observatory (1996 to 2003), Director of CSIRO Australia Telescope National Facility (2003 to 2009), CSIRO SKA Director (2009–2016), and Deputy Vice Chancellor (Enterprise) at the University of New South Wales (2016–2019). He was also involved in science-direction setting in Australia for over 15 years, contributing the mid-term review in 2000, leading the development of the Australian Astronomy Decadal Plan 2006-15 and facilitating the development of the Optical and Radio Astronomy Investment Plan for the National Collaborative Research Infrastructure Strategy in 2007.

Boyle has held positions at the University of Edinburgh, as Director of the Australian Astronomical Observatory (1996 to 2003) and Director of CSIRO Australia Telescope National Facility (2003 to 2009) before his appointment to CSIRO SKA Director in February 2009.

At the end of 2019, Boyle relocated to New Zealand. He built a small observatory and began an astrotourism venture in a winery in the Gibbston valley in the Queenstown-Lakes District.

In 2023/24 Boyle took a leading role as part of the Gibbston Community Association in preparing an application to DarkSky International for accreditation of a dark-sky preserve in the Gibbston area. The Kawarau Gibbston Dark Sky Park was listed as an International Dark Sky Park in May 2024. It is the first dark sky preserve to be accredited in the Otago Region, and the seventh dark sky preserve in New Zealand. The park is located in the Kawarau River valley and is shielded by high mountains, leading to a particularly dark night sky. Central regions of the Magellanic Clouds and the Milky Way galaxy can be viewed and photographed.

Boyle has been involved in local events promoting the night sky, including speaking during Matariki celebrations in Arrowtown over several years.

Boyle is a member of the Winterstellar Charitable Trust, an organisation that holds astrophotography exhibitions.

== Research ==
Boyle has published more than 300 papers in astronomy, and has undertaken research programs on the:

- cosmological distribution of quasars
- clustering of faint galaxies
- nature of galaxies associated with distant quasars
- origin of the X-ray background
- nature of the faint radio source population.

In 2007, Boyle was a member of one of the two teams of scientists who shared the 2007 Gruber Cosmology Prize, and the 2014 Breakthrough Prize in Fundamental Physics. The team was awarded the prize for their discovery that the expansion of the Universe is accelerating, leading to the idea of an expansion force, dubbed dark energy. The team leader, Saul Perlmutter, was awarded the Nobel Prize in Physics for this discovery in 2011.

== Awards (Since 2000) ==
- January 2000: Appointed Adjunct Professor, University of NSW
- January 2001: Centenary Medal for "services to Australian astronomy"
- September 2005: Awarded Fellowship Australian Institute of Company Directors
- May 2006: Elected a Fellow of the Australian Academy of Science
- December 2006: Elected Honorary Fellow of the Royal Astronomical Society
- September 2007: 2007 Gruber Prize in Cosmology (shared)
- January 2013: Public Service Medal for "outstanding public service to Australian astronomy and for leadership of the Australian team bidding to host the international Square Kilometre Array facility".
- November 2014: Awarded Breakthrough Prize in Fundamental Physics (shared)

== See also ==
- CSIRO
- Square Kilometre Array
- Australia Telescope National Facility
- Radio Astronomy
