= CieloBuio =

Italian non-profit organization

CieloBuio-coordinamento per la protezione del cielo notturno (Coordination for the protection of the night sky) is a non-profit organization that operates in Italy for the protection of the night sky by promoting a culture of eco-friendly lighting and raising public awareness about the phenomenon of light pollution.

Created in Lombardy in 1997 around a mailing-list of people interested in the topic of light pollution, CieloBuio now brings together professional and amateur astronomers, environmentalists, lighting engineers, and simply interested people throughout Italy. The current president is Fabio Arcidiacono.

In its fight against light pollution, CieloBuio has as a reference model to support and promote the law of the Lombardy region n. 17/2000, in all its forms and extensions. This law is based on the criterion of zero pollution, according to which, with very few exceptions, no streetlamp can send light above the horizontal plane.

CieloBuio in recent years has played a crucial role in the approval of other regional laws inspired by the Lombard model, among which we mention those in force in the regions of Emilia-Romagna (LR 19/03), Marche (LR 10/02), Abruzzo ( LR 12/05), Apulia (LR 15/05), Umbria (LR 20/05), Friuli-Venezia Giulia (LR 15/07) and Veneto (LR 17/09). In addition, the law passed in Lombardy has also inspired the drafting of laws in the Czech Republic (the first country in the world to enact legislation against light pollution, which applies throughout the country) and in Slovenia.

CieloBuio works in collaboration with the Italian section of the International Dark-Sky Association and various scientific organizations to promote a national law protecting the night environment in the whole of Italy.

== Bodies ==
CieloBuio is divided into the following bodies, more or less formal:

- CieloBuio mailing list, an organ of free association of ideas and activities to support actions on the ground;
- CieloBuio non-profit association, legally recognized, bringing together all those who wish to support more effectively the activities of the working groups;
- the governing council, composed of six members and an honorary president, who makes decisions and sets the strategies for action CieloBuio;
- the technical-scientific committee, composed of six experts who research and develop environmentally friendly lighting solutions to offer and promote.

== Honours ==
In 2000, for the fundamental role played in favor of the law against light pollution in Lombardy, the amateur Gruppo Astrofili Brianza honored CieloBuio with the dedication of the asteroid 13777 Cielobuio, discovered by members of this alliance at Sormano (Como, Italy) on October 20, 1998.

In 2003, the European section of the International Dark-Sky Association awarded the president of CieloBuio, Diego Bonata, with the Galileo Award, an award presented annually to individuals or groups that stand out in Europe in the fight for the preservation of the darkness of the night sky.

In 2004, CieloBuio was among the winners of the Innovazione Amica dell'Ambiente (Environmentally Friendly Innovation) Award, delivered by the Italian environmentalist organization Legambiente in recognition of the results obtained in terms of quality of light, energy saving and environmental protection through the application of the regional law n. 17/00 of Lombardy.
