= NamibRand Nature Reserve =

Private nature reserve in Namibia

Coordinates: 25°S 16°E

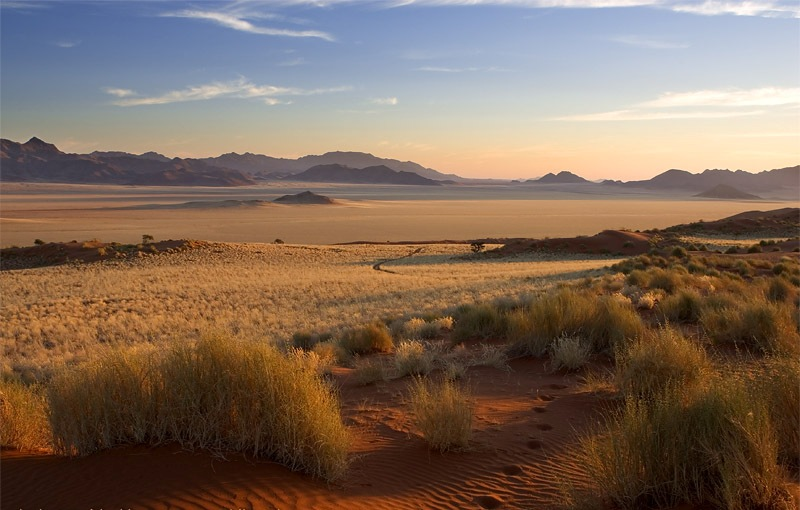
Sunset at the NamibRand Nature Reserve

The NamibRand Nature Reserve is a private nature reserve in Southwestern Namibia in the Namib Desert. Founded in 1984 by J.A. (Albi) Brückner, it has more than 215,000 hectares (2,150 km^{2}) and shares a 100 km border with Namib-Naukluft National Park to the west and the Nubib mountains to the east. It is financially self-sustaining mainly through low impact tourism fees.

In 2012, the International Dark-Sky Association designated this as an International Dark-Sky Reserve.
