= Kaikōura Dark Sky Sanctuary =

Dark sky preserve in New Zealand

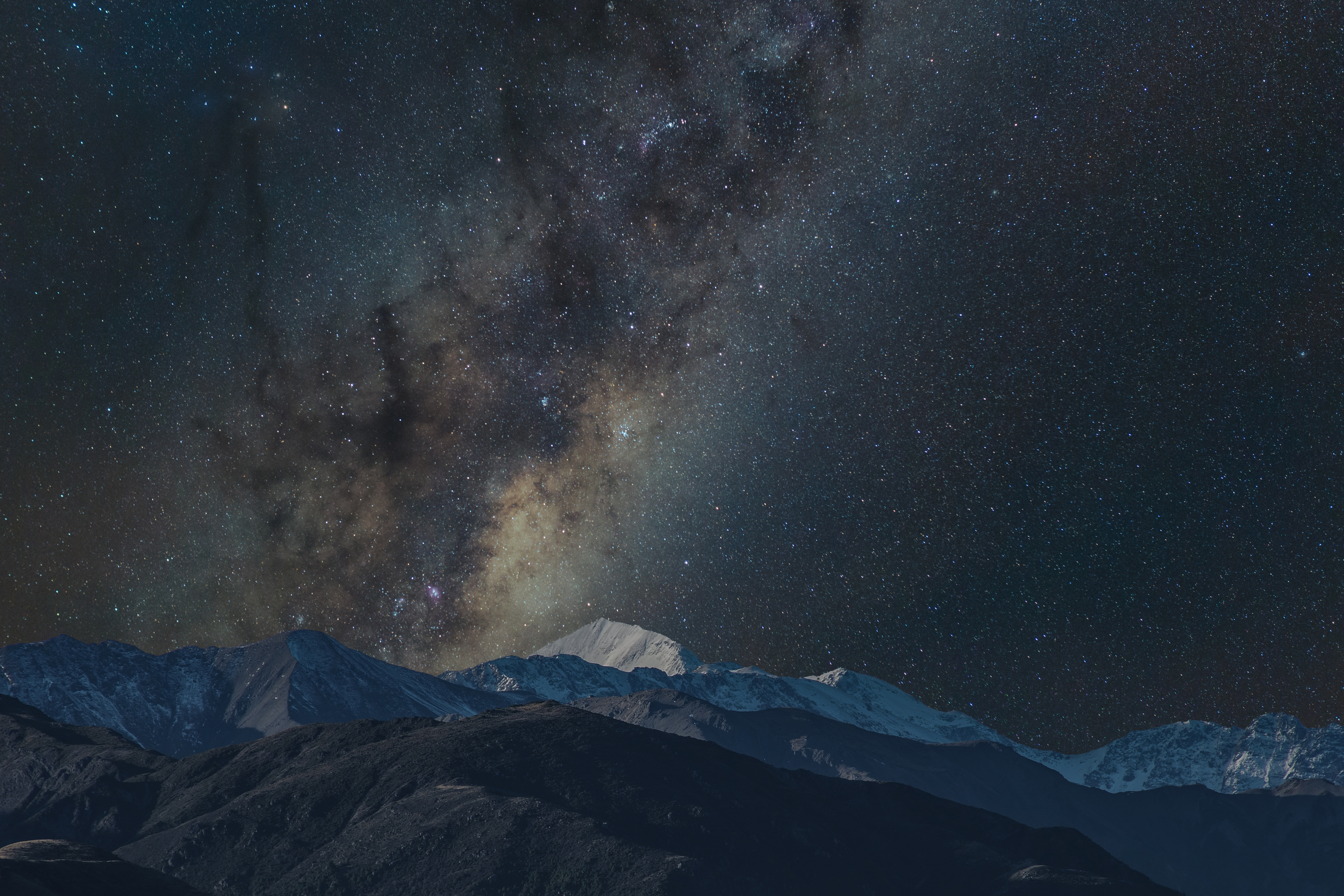
- Milky Way over the Kaikōura mountains
- Interactive map of Kaikōura Dark Sky Sanctuary
- Location: Kaikōura District, New Zealand
- Nearest town: Kaikōura
- Coordinates: 42°15′47″S 173°40′29″E
- Area: 2,039 km^{2} (787 sq mi)
- Designated: 2024
- Governing body: Kaikoura Dark Sky Trust
- Website: kaikouradarksky.nz

The Kaikōura Dark Sky Sanctuary is a dark-sky preserve located in the Kaikōura District in the South Island of New Zealand. It covers an area of 2,039 km^{2} (787 sq mi), representing around 98% of the District, excluding the Kaikōura township. The Kaikōura Dark Sky Sanctuary was accredited as an International Dark Sky Sanctuary by DarkSky International in September 2024. Kaikōura is the third dark sky sanctuary to be accredited in New Zealand.

The Kaikōura Dark Sky Sanctuary has a pristine night sky, providing particularly clear viewing of the Milky Way galaxy. The average night sky luminance is 21.58 mag/arcsec^{2} (corresponding to Bortle scale 3).

== Background ==
A key driver for the establishment of a dark-sky preserve in the Kaikōura area was to help protect the Hutton's shearwater (Puffinus huttoni) or Kaikōura tītī, an endangered seabird in the family Procellariidae.

=== Risk to Hutton's shearwater ===
This bird is found in waters around Australia and New Zealand but it only breeds in the Seaward Kaikōura Range in New Zealand. It is the only seabird in the world that breeds in an alpine environment. The birds fly at night, but can become disoriented by bright lights. Fledglings are particularly vulnerable. They leave their nesting burrows in the mountains in the dark, and can crash-land on roads in the town. They are typically not able to take off again, making them vulnerable to being run over by vehicles or succumbing to predation by dogs or cats. Artificial lighting in the town led to over 200 birds crash-landing during the 2014/15 breeding season. Conservation organisations in Kaikōura rescue stranded birds for later release, and advocate for reduced lighting. Work on improving protection for the Hutton's shearwater from the effects of artificial light in the town began in 2020.

== Establishment ==
A working group led by Nicky McArthur held their first public seminar to promote the Kaikōura dark-sky initiative in February 2021. The Kaikōura Dark Sky Trust was a registered as a charity in New Zealand in 2022, to work towards accreditation of a dark-sky preserve in the Kaikōura area. The trust was established with seed funding provided by the North Canterbury Transport Infrastructure Recovery alliance. The initiative was funded as part of the recovery phase from the 7.8 magnitude 2016 Kaikōura earthquake.

Dark-sky accreditation was expected to boost the local economy by encouraging local astrotourism businesses. In April 2022, the Mayor of Kaikōura said that the dark-sky preserve had the full support of the council, and would be a boost to tourist numbers, especially during the winter period. Kaikōura District Council provided support for the costs of preparing the application to DarkSky International for designation as a dark-sky preserve, and Destination Kaikōura supported the establishment of a website for the trust.

== Designation ==
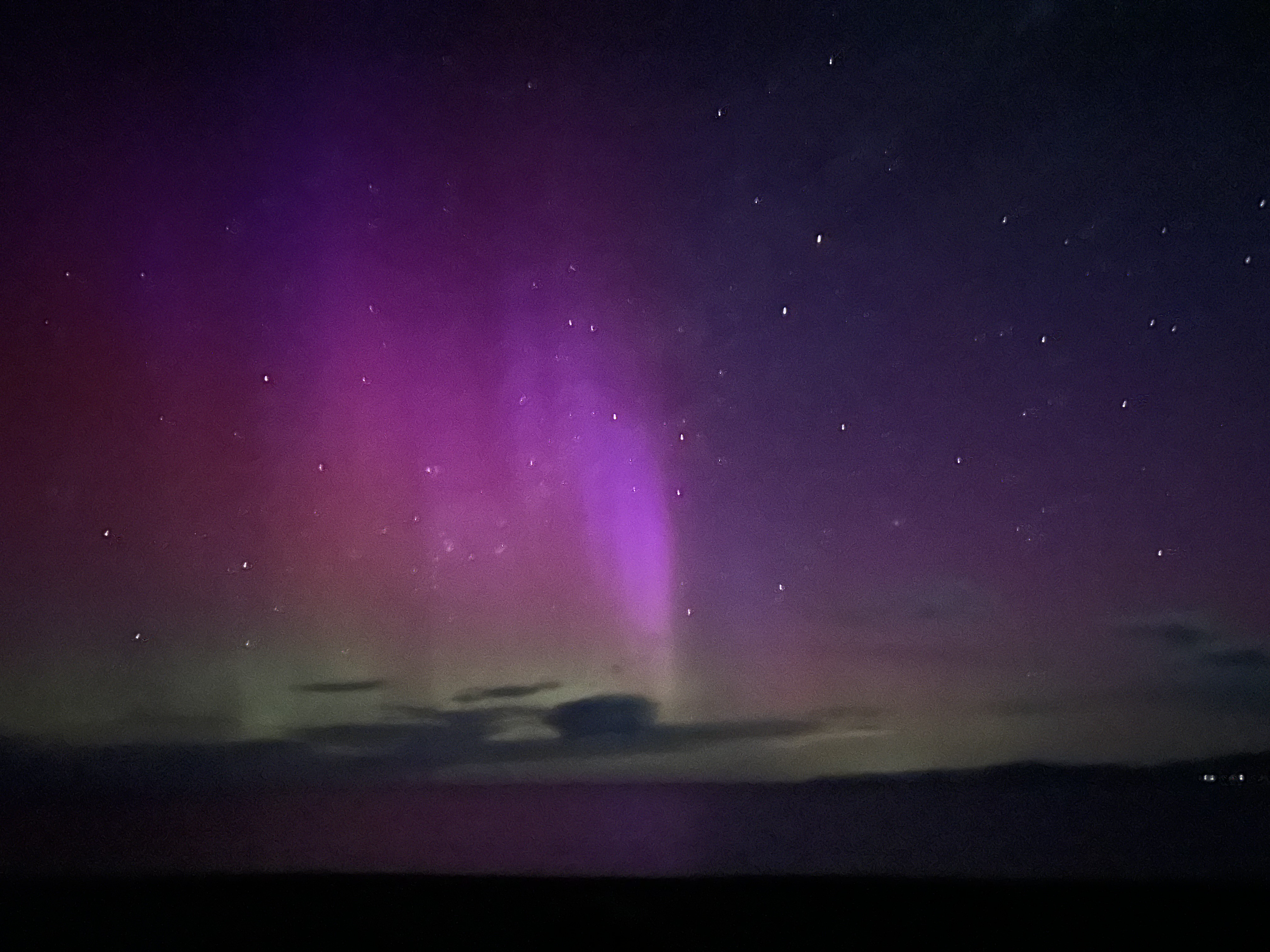
Aurora australis seen from South Bay, Kaikōura

In August 2024, the Kaikōura Dark Sky Trust applied to DarkSky International for designation of an area of 2,039 km^{2} (787 sq mi) as an International Dark Sky Sanctuary. A dark sky sanctuary is a type of dark sky place defined as:

A public or private land that has an exceptional or distinguished quality of starry nights and a nocturnal environment that is protected for its scientific, natural, or educational value, its cultural heritage, and/or public enjoyment.

DarkSky International announced the designation on 12 September 2024. At the time of the announcement, it was only the 22nd location world-wide to receive this recognition. Kaikōura is the third dark sky sanctuary to be accredited in New Zealand, after Aotea Great Barrier Island in 2017 and Stewart Island/Rakiura in 2019. The Kaikōura Dark Sky Trust plans to apply for the Kaikōura township to be recognised with international dark sky community status. Accreditation of the Kaikōura Dark Sky Sanctuary is a step towards New Zealand seeking accreditation as a Dark Sky Nation.

== Changes to lighting ==
In addition to seeking accreditation as a dark-sky preserve, the objectives of the Kaikōura Dark Sky Trust include protecting and enhancing the night skies and leading initiatives to reduce light pollution in the Kaikōura District. In 2024, the Trust submitted a plan change request to the District Council, seeking changes to council regulations about lighting that would meet requirements for the designation of a dark-sky preserve. These changes were adopted, and apply to new build projects and when lighting is being replaced. The changes to the Kaikōura District outdoor lighting rules were aimed at new builds, and designed to reduce unnecessary or excessive use of artificial light at night. The rules include the use of motion sensors to activate lights, replacement of light fittings at their end-of-life using lamps with a colour temperature of 3,000 K or less, and restrictions for night-time lighting for sports events and for illumination of buildings for aesthetic purposes.

The New Zealand Transport Agency (NZTA) agreed to change the street lighting on State Highway 1 through the town, using fully-shielded luminaires with colour temperature of 2,200 K or 2,700 K. A staged programme of works to replace old lights began in April 2025 and was completed late that year, with NZTA ensuring that warm LED colour temperatures were used in areas on the known flight paths of the Hutton's shearwater.

== Astrotourism ==
The Kaikōura Dark Sky Sanctuary is promoted as an astrotourism destination, with commercial operators providing stargazing experiences for visitors. The town is planning for astrotourism to help Kaikōura become a year-round tourist destination.

== Recognition and awards ==
In May 2025, Nicky McArthur was recognised by the Royal Astronomical Society of New Zealand with a Bright Star award for her work in leading the establishment of the Dark Sky Sanctuary.

In November 2025, Larry Field of the Kaikōura Dark Sky Trust was recognised by DarkSky International with the 2025 Dr. Arthur Hoag and William T. Robinson Award for his science, advocacy and engagement with the community to protect and promote the night sky.

== See also ==
- Dark sky movement in New Zealand
