= Oxford Forest Conservation Area =

Protected area in New Zealand

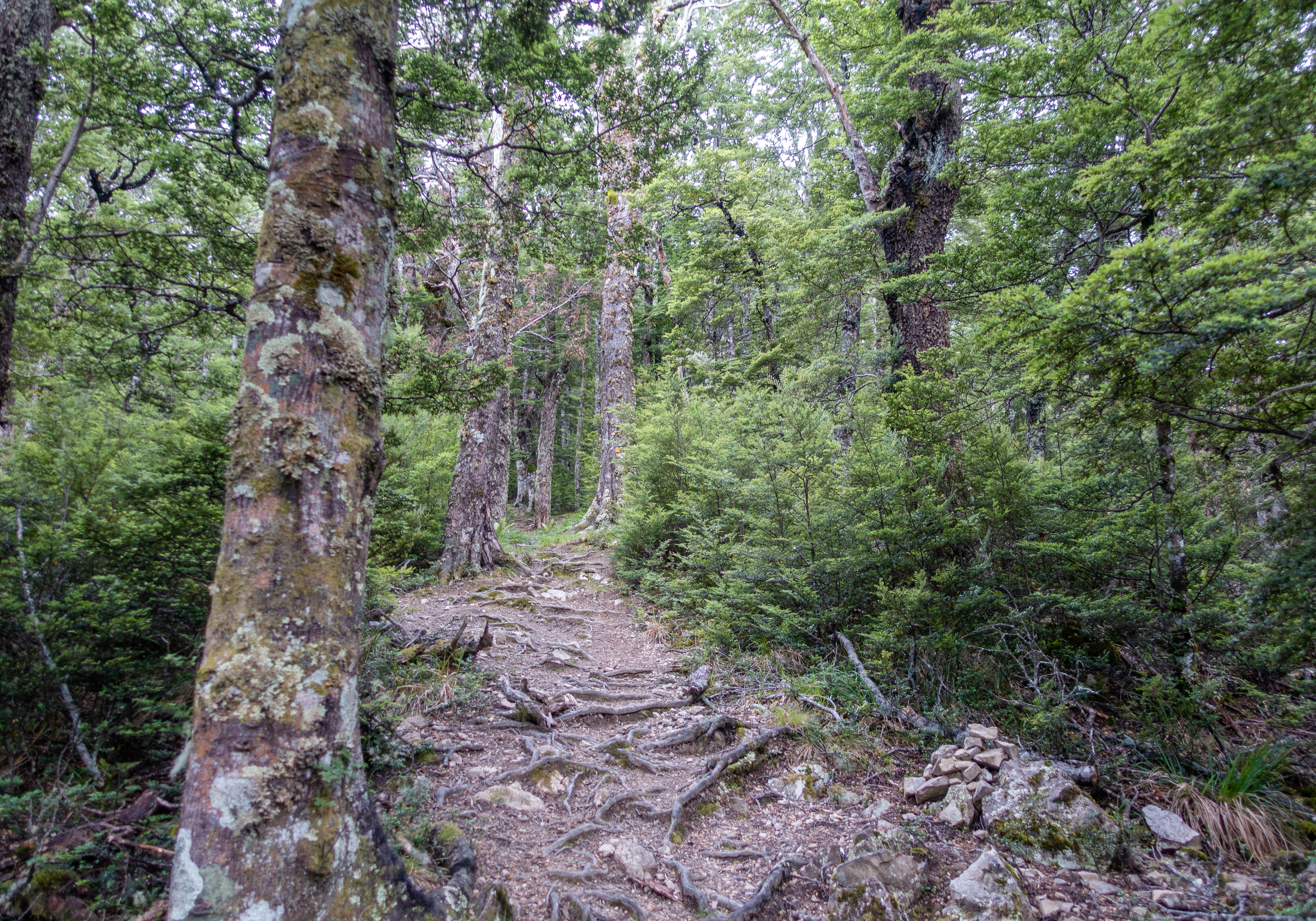
- Mt Oxford Track, Oxford Forest Conservation Area
- Interactive map of Oxford Forest Conservation Area
- Location: Canterbury, New Zealand
- Nearest town: Oxford
- Coordinates: 43°13′41″S 172°03′03″E
- Area: 113.5 km^{2} (43.8 sq mi)
- Operator: Department of Conservation

The Oxford Forest Conservation Area is a protected forest area of 11,350 ha (28,000 acres) located in foothills near the township of Oxford in North Canterbury, New Zealand. The area is also an accredited International Dark Sky Park.

The forest is a remnant of extensive beech and podocarp forests that previously covered inland parts of North Canterbury. Species present in the forest include mountain beech and examples of the podocarps rimu, mataī, kahikatea, and tōtara. The forest is mainly black beech (Nothofagus solandri) at lower altitudes, with mountain beech (Nothofagus cliffortioides) above 600 m (2,000 ft). From around 1851 to 1909, logging took place in the Oxford Forest and the nearby Woodside Forest property. Several fires in the late 19th century destroyed much of the forest, and logging ceased in 1915. Some areas of beech forest regenerated following a major fire in 1898. Sheep were grazed in some places from 1914, but grazing reduced after the 1930s, allowing more land to revert to beech. By 1973, the area was being managed as a forest park, with increasing areas of regenerating beech and plantations of exotic species.

The Oxford Forest Conservation Area is classified as stewardship land, under section 25 of the Conservation Act 1987. It includes walking and mountain biking tracks and is a recreational hunting area. The conservation area includes Mount Oxford, with a height of 1,364 m (4,475 ft).

== International Dark Sky Park ==
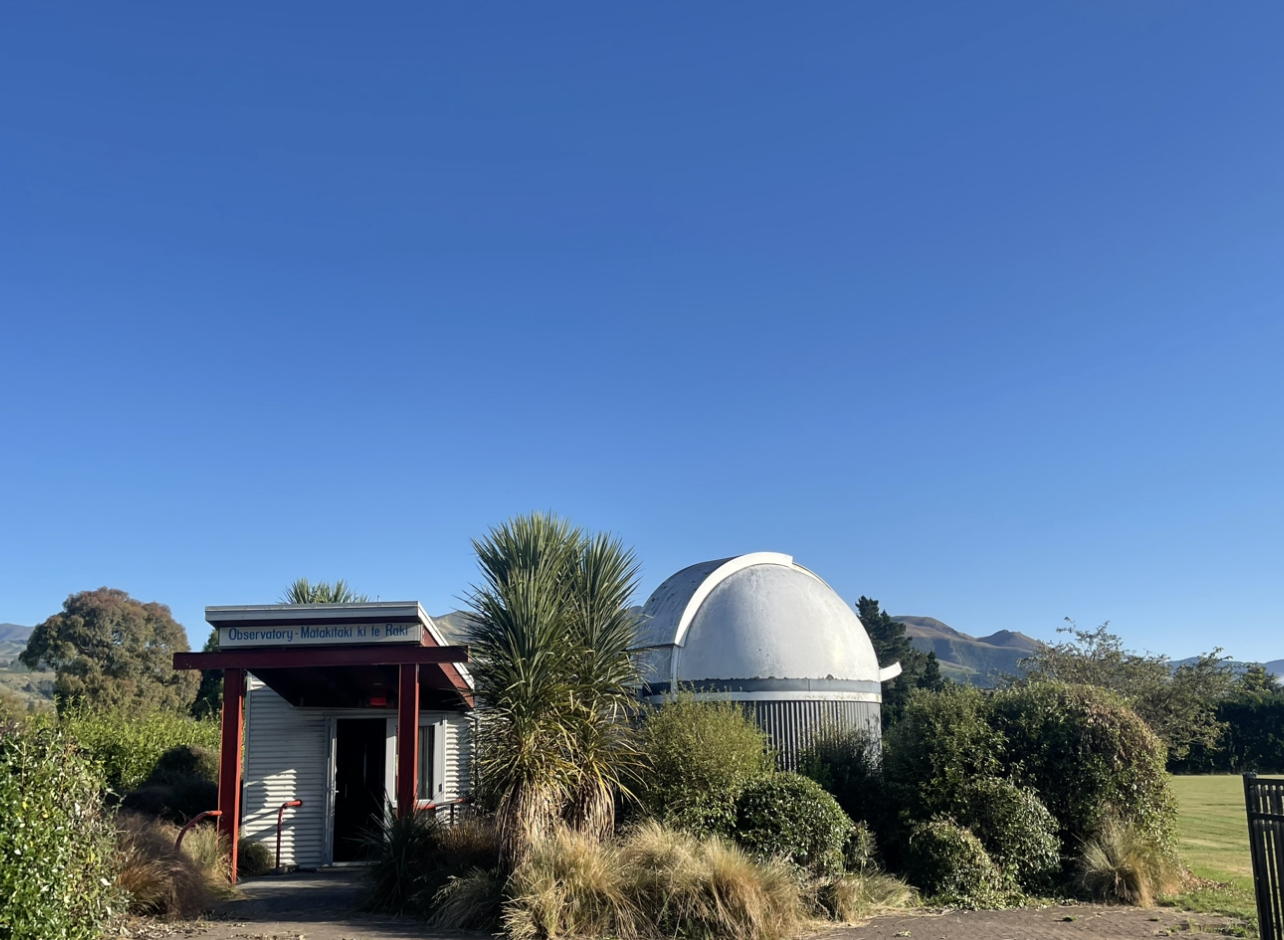
Oxford Observatory at foothills

In 2024, the conservation area was designated by DarkSky International as New Zealand's second International Dark Sky Park. Readings of night sky luminance in the park have a median value of 21.45 mag/arcsec^{2} (corresponding to Bortle scale 3), and in places are as dark as 21.76 and 21.80 mag/arcsec^{2} (Bortle scale 1).

The application for designation was prepared by the Oxford Dark Sky Group, with member organisations including the Department of Conservation, the Waimakariri District Council, local schools, the Oxford Promotions Action Committee, community groups and sports clubs. The accreditation of the Oxford Forest Conservation Area is an initial step towards a larger dark-sky preserve. There are plans to reduce light pollution from the township of Oxford and extend the area of the dark-sky preserve by ten times, with the conservation area as the central dark core.

== See also ==
- Dark sky movement in New Zealand
