= Wai-iti Dark Sky Park =

Protected area in New Zealand

- Interactive map of Wai-iti Dark Sky Park
- Location: Tasman District, New Zealand
- Nearest city: Nelson
- Coordinates: 41.4299°S 172.9933°E
- Area: 1.35 km^{2} (0.52 sq mi)
- Designated: 2020
- Operator: Tasman District Council
- Website: www.darkskies.nz

The Wai-iti Dark Sky Park is an accredited International Dark Sky Park, located near the township of Wakefield in the Tasman District of New Zealand. It covers an area of 135 ha (330 acres) of Tasman District Council land, including Tunnicliff Forest and the Wai-iti Recreation Reserve. Wai-iti is the first International Dark Sky Park to be designated in New Zealand by DarkSky International.

The park is located around 4 km (2.5 mi) from Wakefield, and 33 km (21 mi) from Nelson, and is adjacent to the Wai-iti River.

The application for the dark sky park status was prepared by the Top of the South Dark Sky committee, a group associated with the Nelson Science Society Astronomy Section. Accreditation was announced in July 2020. The application reported that readings of night sky luminance in the park taken over a period of 5 years have an average value of 21.52 mag/arcsec^{2} (corresponding to Bortle scale 3), with a few individual readings of 21.84 mag/arcsec^{2} (Bortle scale 1).

In July 2023, the Top of the South Dark Sky Committee warned the District Council that the Dark Sky Park accreditation was at risk because there had been a 150% increase in light pollution in the park over a period of three years. Factors leading to the increase in light pollution were thought to include the expansion of residential and industrial subdivisions within 25 km (16 mi) of the park, increasing street lighting, and the use of 4,000 K LED street lights. At the time of the application for accreditation, the District Council had agreed to a lighting management plan, but as of 2023, this had not been implemented. The advocates for the Dark Sky Park urged that luminaires in sensitive areas be refitted with 2,200 K amber phosphorus LEDs.

== See also ==
- Dark sky movement in New Zealand
