= Aorangi Forest Park =

Protected area in New Zealand

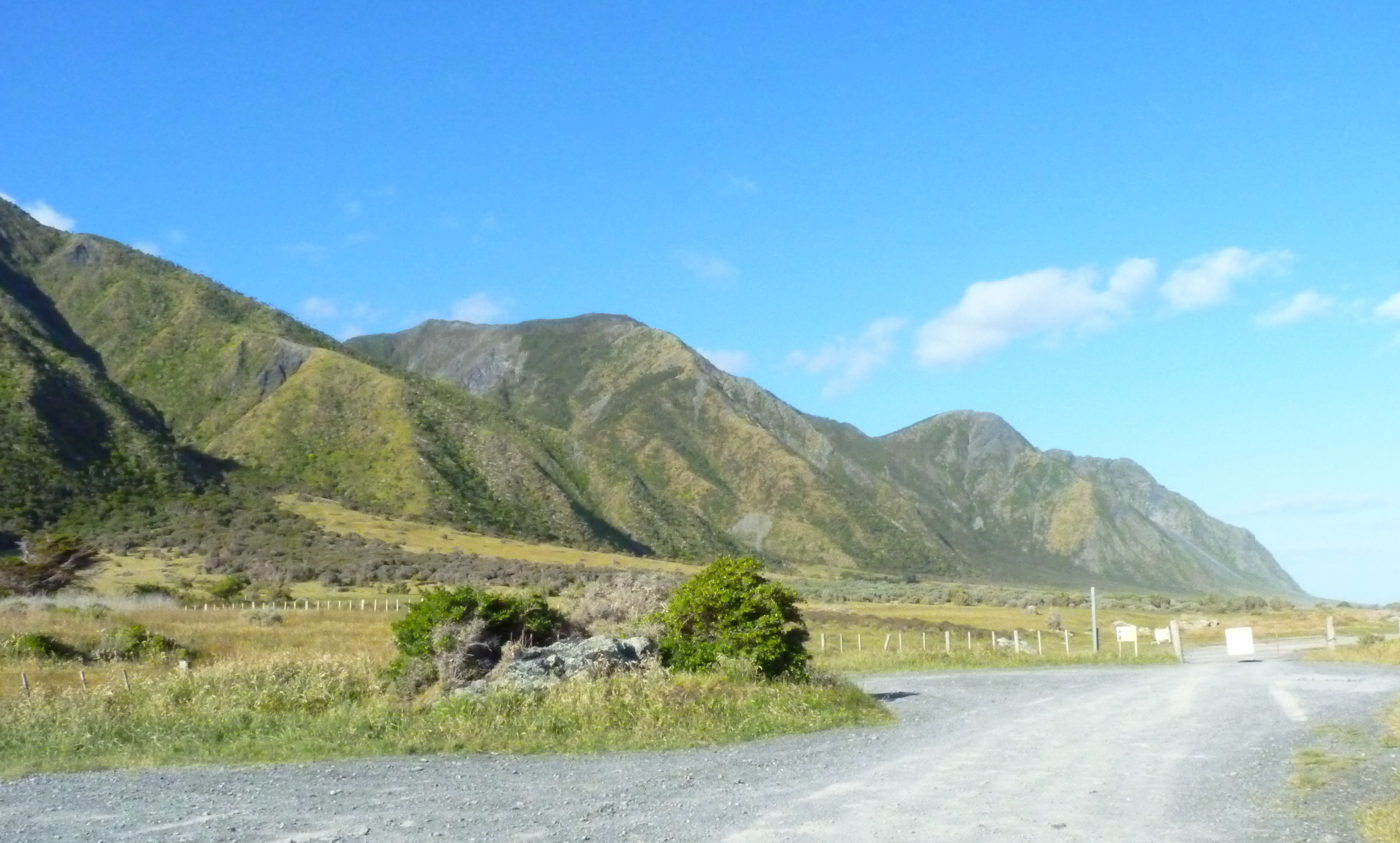
- Aorangi Forest Park near Cape Palliser

- Location within New Zealand
- Location: North Island, New Zealand
- Nearest city: Wellington
- Coordinates: 41.421104°S 175.362396°E
- Area: 19,402 hectares (47,940 acres)
- Established: 1978
- Governing body: Department of Conservation

Aorangi Forest Park is a 194-square-kilometre (75 sq mi) protected area in the Wellington Region of New Zealand administered by the Department of Conservation (DOC). It had been called the Haurangi Forest Park but DOC changed to reflect the Māori name of the range protected by the park.

The park has six backcountry huts and a recreational hunting area in the park. There is a large herd of wild red deer and dry conditions, making the park a popular destination for deerstalkers. There is also a small number of goats and pigs in the park.

The park can be accessed by foot from several local roads, or via private land with the permission of landowners.

== History ==
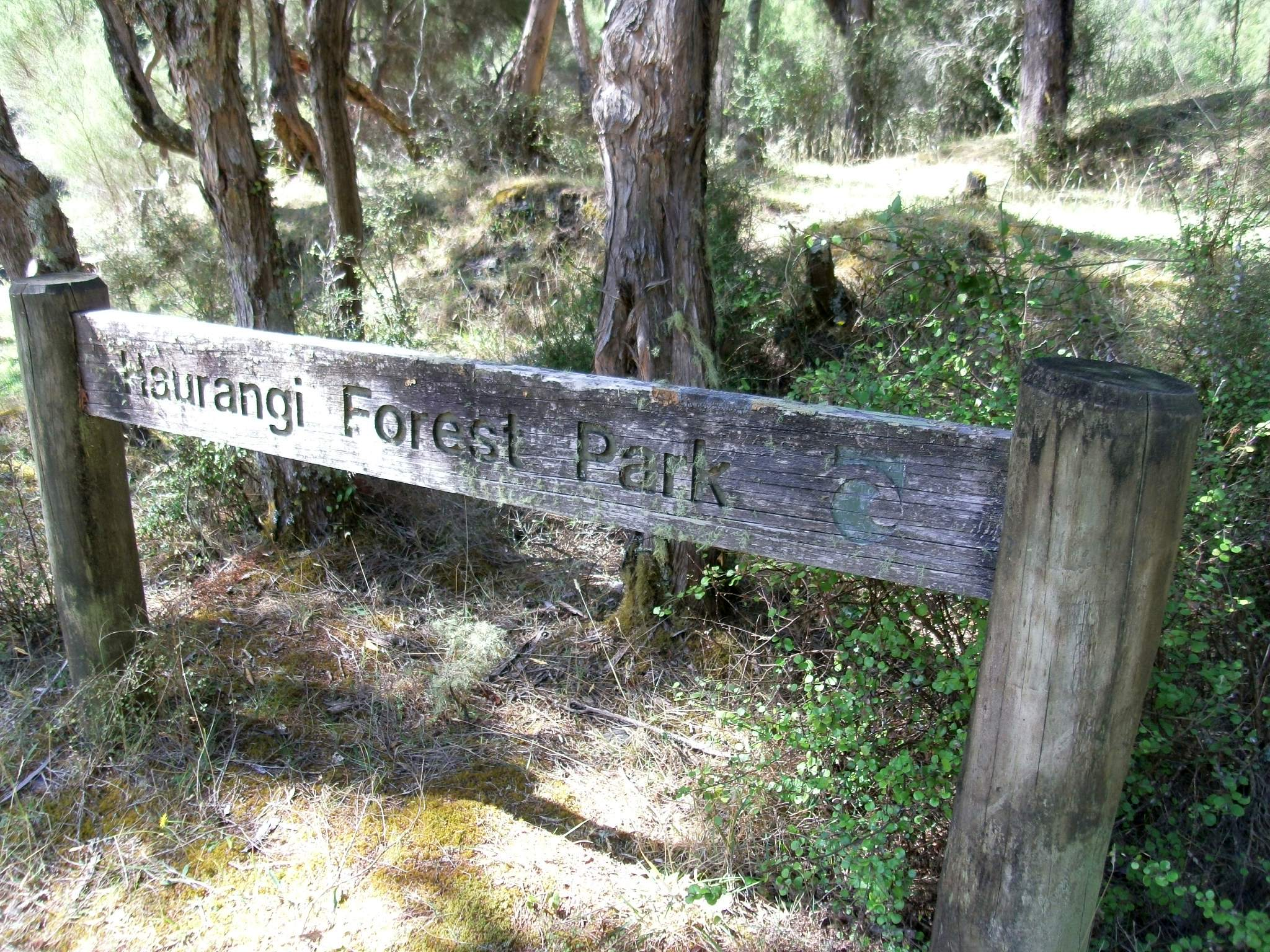
Sign with former name

A sole-charger presided over the park for several decades, serving as "part caretaker, part sheriff" and de facto police, fire service and fisheries officer.

A rare native long-tailed bat was detected in the forest park in March 2020.

A 17-year-old hunter was rescued from the park in July 2020 after falling down a cliff.

In 2021, James Cameron and his wife committed part of their farmland to establishing a functioning native forest from the Aorangi Forest Park to the foothills of the Remutaka Ranges.

Two families became stranded in the park overnight in June 2021 after their four-wheel drive became stuck.

== International Dark Sky Reserve ==
The Wairarapa Dark Sky Reserve is an area of 3,665 km^{2} (1,415 sq mi) that was designated in January 2023. The reserve is certified as an International Dark Sky Reserve, requiring a dark "core" zone that is surrounded by a populated area where policy controls protect the darkness of the core. For the Wairarapa reserve, the dark core is the entire area of the Aorangi Forest Park in the south of the reserve.

== See also ==
- Forest Parks of New Zealand
- Protected areas of New Zealand
- Conservation in New Zealand
- Tramping in New Zealand
