= Aoraki Mackenzie International Dark Sky Reserve =

Dark sky reserve in New Zealand

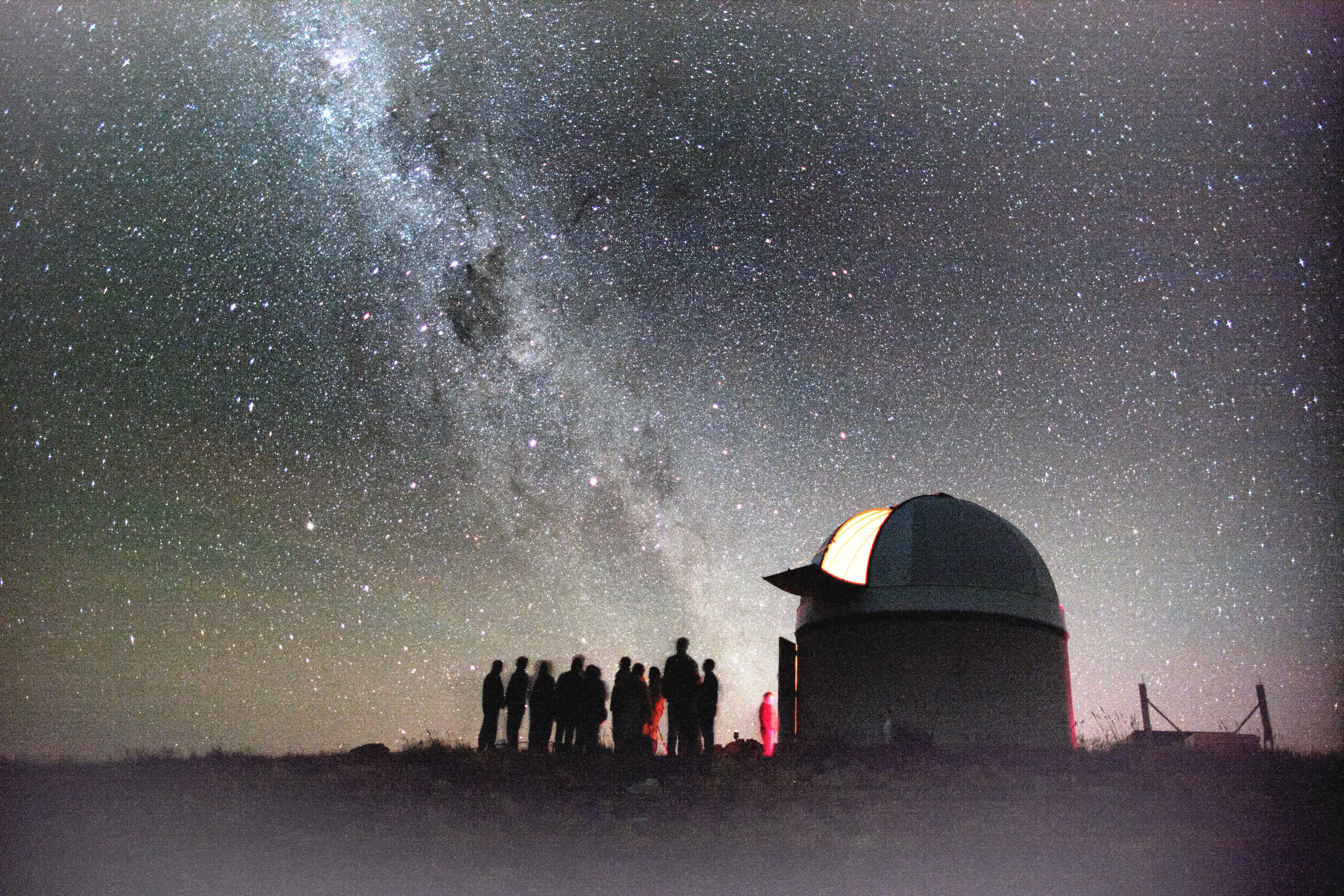
- Mount John Observatory
- Location: Aoraki / Mount Cook, New Zealand
- Nearest town: Twizel
- Area: 4,367 km^{2} (1,686 sq mi)
- Designated: 2012
- Governing body: International Dark-Sky Association
- Website: www.darkskyreserve.org.nz

The Aoraki Mackenzie International Dark Sky Reserve is an area of 4,367 km^{2} (1,686 sq mi) that was designated as an International Dark Sky Reserve by the International Dark-Sky Association in June 2012. The reserve is located in the Mackenzie District in the South Island of New Zealand. At the time of the designation in 2012, the reserve was the largest in the world, and the only reserve of its type in the Southern Hemisphere.

The area covered by the reserve includes the Aoraki / Mount Cook National Park and the Mackenzie Basin, Lake Pukaki and Lake Tekapo. The main settlements within the reserve are Mount Cook Village, Twizel, and Lake Tekapo (town).

The night sky brightness in the reserve ranks at a level 2 on the nine-level Bortle Dark-Sky Scale, representing a truly dark site with high astronomical observability of celestial objects. The low level of light pollution in the area of the reserve has been supported by a lighting by-law that was included in the Mackenzie District Plan in 1981.

The Mount John University Observatory is located in the reserve, and is the main astronomical research observatory in New Zealand. There are many stargazing tourism ventures in the region, including the well-known Dark Sky Project in the Lake Tekapo township, along with a variety of other local businesses offering stargazing and astrophotography experiences.

In 2025, NZ Post celebrated the twentieth anniversary of the Dark Sky Project in New Zealand by issuing a set of commemorative stamps featuring the constellations Matariki, the Southern Cross, and Taurus.

== See also ==
- Dark sky movement in New Zealand
