= DarkSky International =

Environmental organization focused on light pollution

- Formation: 1988; 38 years ago
- Founded at: United States
- Type: Nonprofit
- Tax ID no.: 74-2493011
- Legal status: 501(c)(3)
- Headquarters: Tucson, Arizona, United States
- Board President: Nalayini Brito-Davies
- CEO & Executive Director: Ruskin Hartley
- Board of directors: Nalayini Brito-Davies; Connie Walker; Brad Schlesselman; Samyukta Manikumar; Ken Walczak; Diane Knutson;Tom Reinert; Kevin Gaston; Sibylle Schroer; Sergio Emilio Montúfar Codoñer; Mike Simmons; Paulina Villalobos; Fernando Avila Castro; Doug Barker; Alejandra Voigt
- Website: darksky.org

DarkSky International, formerly the International Dark-Sky Association (IDA), is an United States–based nonprofit, incorporated in 1988 by founders David Crawford, a professional astronomer, and Tim Hunter, a physician and amateur astronomer. The mission of DarkSky International is 'to preserve and protect the night time environment and our heritage of dark skies through quality outdoor lighting.'

== Light pollution ==
Light pollution is the result of outdoor lighting that is not properly shielded, allowing light shine into the eyes and night sky. Light pollution has been proven to be problematic for our health, according to the NIH. Direct light that shines into the eyes is called glare, and light directed into the night sky above the horizon causes skyglow. Lighting can also cause light trespass when it enters areas where unwanted (e.g. a neighbor's yard and windows). DarkSky is the first and currently the largest organization in the dark-sky movement.

== Principal approach ==
DarkSky's principal approach is to raise awareness about the value of dark, star-filled night skies and encourage their protection and restoration through education about the problems and solutions, including outdoor lighting practices that create less light pollution. In 2011, the organization had about 5,000 members in 70 countries. By 2026, the organization had over 193,000 supporters and over 65 chapters.

An image of an ideally dark night sky

== International Dark Sky Places ==
To promote awareness about the issues, DarkSky has an International Dark Sky Places program that aims 'to encourage communities, parks and protected areas around the world to preserve and protect dark sites through responsible lighting policies and public education.' There are currently five types of designation for International Dark Sky Places:

- International Dark Sky Sanctuaries
- International Dark Sky Parks
- International Dark Sky Reserves
- International Dark Sky Communities
- Urban Night Sky Places

=== International Dark Sky Sanctuaries ===
DarkSky describes Dark Sky Sanctuaries as "the most remote (and often darkest) places in the world whose conservation state is most fragile".

- !Ae!Hai Kalahari Heritage Park South Africa, designated 2019
- Aotea / Great Barrier Island New Zealand, designated 2017
- Oregon Outback, Oregon, United States, designated 2024
- Boundary Waters Canoe Area Wilderness, Minnesota, United States, designated 2020
- Beaver Islands State Wildlife Research Area
- Cosmic Campground United States, designated 2016
- Devils River State Natural Area – Del Norte Unit United States, designated 2019
- Bardsey Island/Ynys Enlli – Wales (United Kingdom), designated 2023
- Gabriela Mistral Dark Sky Sanctuary Elqui Valley, Chile, designated 2015
- Kaikōura Dark Sky Sanctuary New Zealand, designated 2024
- Katahdin Woods and Waters National Monument United States, designated 2020
- Massacre Rim Wilderness Study Area Washoe County, Nevada, United States, designated 2019
- Medicine Rocks State Park United States, designated 2020
- Niue, designated 2020 – the first entire country to be designated.
- Pitcairn Islands designated 2019
- Rainbow Bridge National Monument United States, designated 2018
- Stewart Island / Rakiura New Zealand, designated 2019.
- Tāhuna Glenorchy Dark Sky Sanctuary New Zealand, designated 2025.
- The Jump-Up Queensland, Australia, designated 2019

=== International Dark Sky Parks ===
DarkSky describes Dark Sky Parks as "publicly- or privately-owned spaces protected for natural conservation that implement good outdoor lighting and provide dark sky programs for visitors".

- Natural Bridges National Monument, Utah, United States, designated 2006
- Cherry Springs State Park, Pennsylvania, United States, designated 2008
- Galloway Forest Park, Scotland, United Kingdom, designated 2009
- Zselic National Landscape Protection Area, Hungary, designated 2009
- Clayton Lake State Park, New Mexico, United States, designated 2010
- Goldendale Observatory State Park, Washington, United States, designated 2010, suspended 2016, revoked 2017
- Hortobágy National Park, Hungary, designated 2011
- The Headlands, Michigan, United States, designated 2011
- Observatory Park, Ohio, United States, designated 2011
- Big Bend National Park, Texas, United States, designated 2012
- Big Bend Ranch State Park, Texas, United States, designated 2017
- Death Valley National Park, California, United States, designated 2013
- Chaco Culture National Historical Park, New Mexico, United States, designated 2013
- Northumberland National Park, England, United Kingdom, designated 2013
- Eifel National Park, Germany, designated 2014
- Mayland Community College Blue Ridge Observatory and Star Park, North Carolina, United States, designated 2014
- Grand Canyon-Parashant National Monument, Arizona, United States, designated 2014
- Hovenweep National Monument, Utah and Colorado, United States, designated 2014
- Copper Breaks State Park, Texas, United States, designated 2014
- Enchanted Rock State Natural Area, Texas, United States, designated 2014
- Elan Valley Estate, Wales, United Kingdom, designated 2015
- Yeongyang Firefly Eco Park, Yeongyang, South Korea, designated 2015
- Mayo International Dark Sky Park, County Mayo, Ireland, designated 2016
- Warrumbungle National Park, New South Wales, Australia, designated 2016
- Dead Horse Point State Park, Utah, United States, designated 2016
- Wupatki National Monument, Arizona, United States, designated 2016
- Walnut Canyon National Monument, Arizona, United States, designated 2016
- Sunset Crater National Monument, Arizona, United States, designated 2016
- Big Cypress National Preserve, Florida, United States, designated 2016
- Waterton-Glacier International Peace Park, Alberta, Canada and Montana, United States, designated 2017
- Ramon Crater, Negev Desert, Israel, designated 2017
- Kartchner Caverns State Park, Arizona, United States, designated 2017
- Joshua Tree National Park, California, United States, designated 2017
- Newport State Park, Wisconsin, United States, designated 2017
- Craters of the Moon National Monument and Preserve, Idaho, designated 2017
- Obed Wild and Scenic River, Tennessee, United States, designated 2017
- Anza-Borrego Desert State Park, California, United States, designated 2018
- Iriomote-Ishigaki National Park, Okinawa Prefecture, Japan, designated 2018
- Steinaker State Park, Utah, United States, designated 2018
- Middle Fork River Forest Preserve, Illinois, United States, designated 2018
- Grand Canyon National Park, Arizona, United States, designated 2019
- Great Sand Dunes National Park and Preserve, Colorado, United States, designated 2019
- Hehuan Mountain, Nantou County, Taiwan, designated 2019
- El Morro National Monument, New Mexico, United States, designated 2019
- Pisgah Astronomical Research Institute, North Carolina, United States, designated 2020
- Kōzu-shima, Tokyo Metropolis, Japan, designated 2020
- Wai-iti Dark Sky Park, New Zealand, designated 2020
- Quetico Provincial Park, Ontario, Canada, designated 2021
- Valles Caldera National Preserve, New Mexico, United States, designated 2021
- Sky Meadows State Park, Virginia, United States, designated 2021
- City of Rocks National Reserve, Idaho, United States, designated 2023
- Aenos National Park, Cephalonia, Greece, designated 2023
- Mont-Tremblant National Park, Quebec, Canada, designated 2023
- Oxford Forest Conservation Area, North Canterbury, New Zealand, designated 2024
- Kawarau Gibbston Dark Sky Park, Queenstown-Lakes District, New Zealand, designated 2024
- Øvre Pasvik National Park, Sør-Varanger, Norway, designated 2024
- Caprock Canyons State Park and Trailway, Briscoe County, Texas, United States, designated 2025
- Snow Canyon State Park, Utah, United States, designated 2025

=== International Dark Sky Reserves ===
IDA describes Dark Sky Reserves as "dark 'core' zones surrounded by a populated periphery where policy controls are enacted to protect the darkness of the core".

- Aoraki Mackenzie International Dark Sky Reserve, South Island, New Zealand, designated 2012
- Brecon Beacons National Park, Wales, United Kingdom, designated 2013
- Central Idaho Dark Sky Reserve, Idaho, United States, designated 2017
- Exmoor National Park, England, United Kingdom, designated 2011
- Kerry International Dark-Sky Reserve, County Kerry, Ireland, designated 2014
- The Reserve at Mont-Mégantic, Quebec, Canada, designated 2008
- Moore's Reserve (South Downs), England, United Kingdom, designated 2016
- NamibRand Nature Reserve, Namibia, designated 2012
- Morvan Regional Natural Park, central France, designated 2025
- Pic du Midi, France, designated 2013
- Rhön Biosphere Reserve, Germany, designated 2014
- River Murray International Dark Sky Reserve, near Swan Reach, South Australia, designated 2019
- Snowdonia National Park, Wales, United Kingdom, designated 2015
- Westhavelland Nature Park, Germany, designated 2014
- Wairarapa Dark Sky Reserve, New Zealand, designated 2023

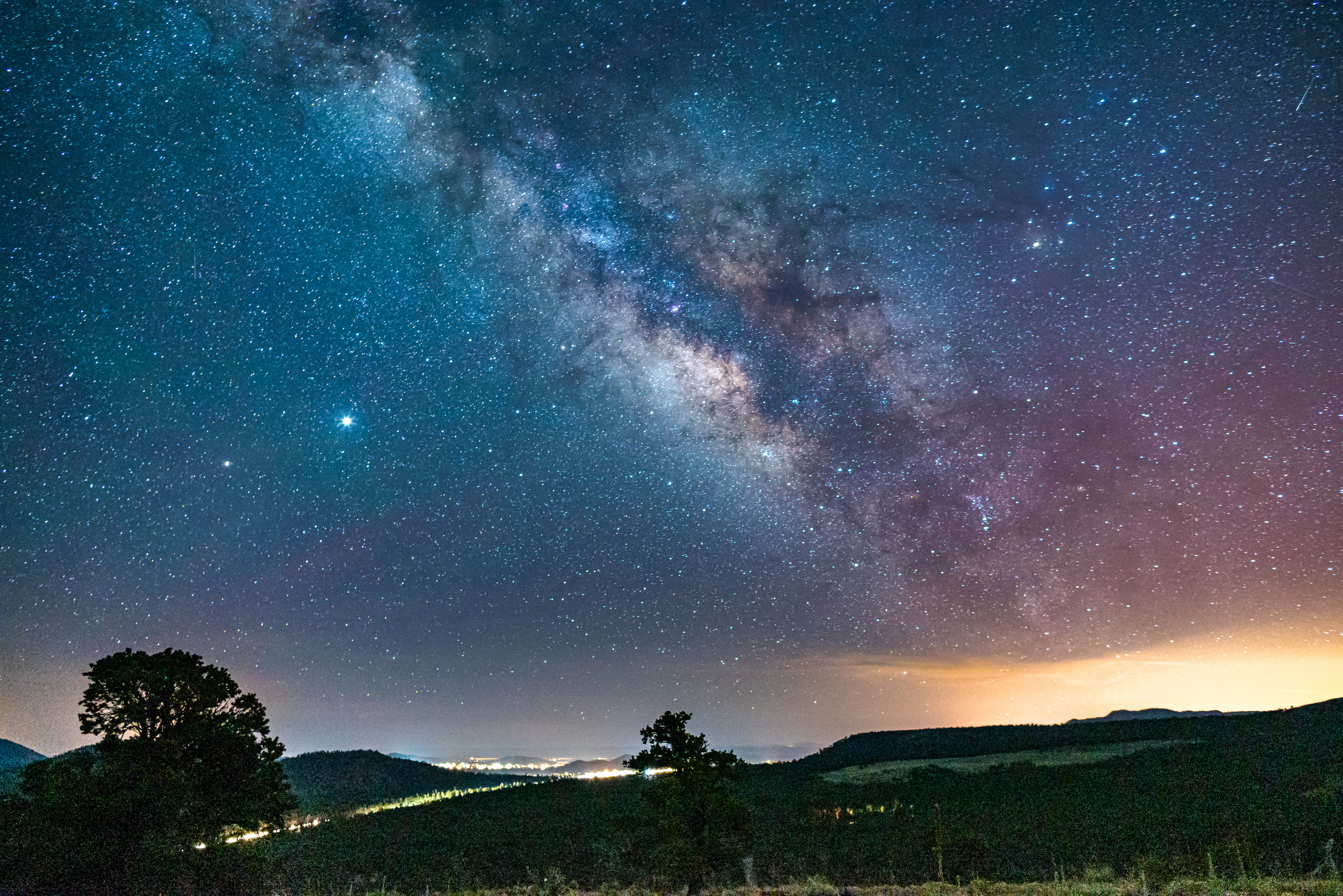
The Milky Way, imaged over Flagstaff

=== International Dark Sky Communities ===
DarkSky describes Dark Sky Communities as "legally organized cities and towns that adopt quality outdoor lighting ordinances and undertake efforts to educate residents about the importance of dark skies".

- Flagstaff, Arizona was the first city to ever receive a Dark Sky certificate. Designated 2001.
- Borrego Springs, California, United States, designated 2009
- Sark, Channel Islands, designated 2011
- Homer Glen, Illinois, United States, designated 2011
- Coll in the Inner Hebrides of Scotland, designated 2013
- Dripping Springs, Texas, United States, designated 2014
- Beverly Shores, Indiana, United States, designated 2014
- Sedona, Arizona, United States, designated 2014
- Westcliffe and Silver Cliff, Colorado, United States, designated 2015
- Thunder Mountain Pootsee Nightsky, Arizona, United States, designated 2015
- Bon Accord, Alberta, Canada, designated 2015
- Horseshoe Bay, Texas, designated 2015
- Moffat, Scotland, designated 2016
- Big Park/Village of Oak Creek, Arizona, designated 2016
- River Oaks, Texas, Dark Sky Friendly Development of Distinction, designated 2017
- Ketchum, Idaho, designated 2017
- Møn, Denmark & Nyord, Denmark, designated 2017
- Fountain Hills, Arizona, designated 2018
- Torrey, Utah, designated 2018
- Camp Verde, Arizona, designated 2018
- Wimberley and Woodcreek, Texas designated 2018
- Lakewood Village, Texas, designated 2020
- Crestone, Colorado, designated in 2020
- Groveland, Florida, designated in 2023
- Bee Cave, Texas, designated in 2023
- Breckenridge, Colorado, designated in 2025
- Naseby, New Zealand designated in 2025

=== Urban Night Sky Places ===
DarkSky describes Urban Night Sky Places as sites 'near or surrounded by large urban environments, whose planning and design actively promote an authentic night-time experiences amid significant artificial light at night'.

- Fry Family Park, Ohio, U.S., designated 2021
- Palos Preserves, Illinois, U.S., designated 2021
- Shield Ranch Barton Creek, Texas, U.S., designated 2024
- Stacy Park, Missouri, U.S., designated 2021
- Thousand Hills State Park, Missouri, U.S., designated 2024
- Timpanogos Cave National Monument, Utah, U.S., designated 2020
- Valle de Oro National Wildlife Refuge, New Mexico, U.S., designated 2019

== Fixture Seal of Approval ==
To promote the use of responsible outdoor lighting that minimizes light pollution, DarkSky offers a Fixture Seal of Approval program. The program provides objective, third-party certification for lighting products that minimize glare, reduce light trespass, and do not pollute the night sky.

== See also ==
- Astrotourism
- Bortle scale
- Commission for Dark Skies
- CieloBuio, an Italian coordination for the protection of the night sky
- Dark-sky movement
- Dark-sky preserve
- International Dark Sky Week
- Light pollution
- List of astronomical societies
- Sky brightness
