= Dark-sky preserve =

Area that restricts artificial light pollution

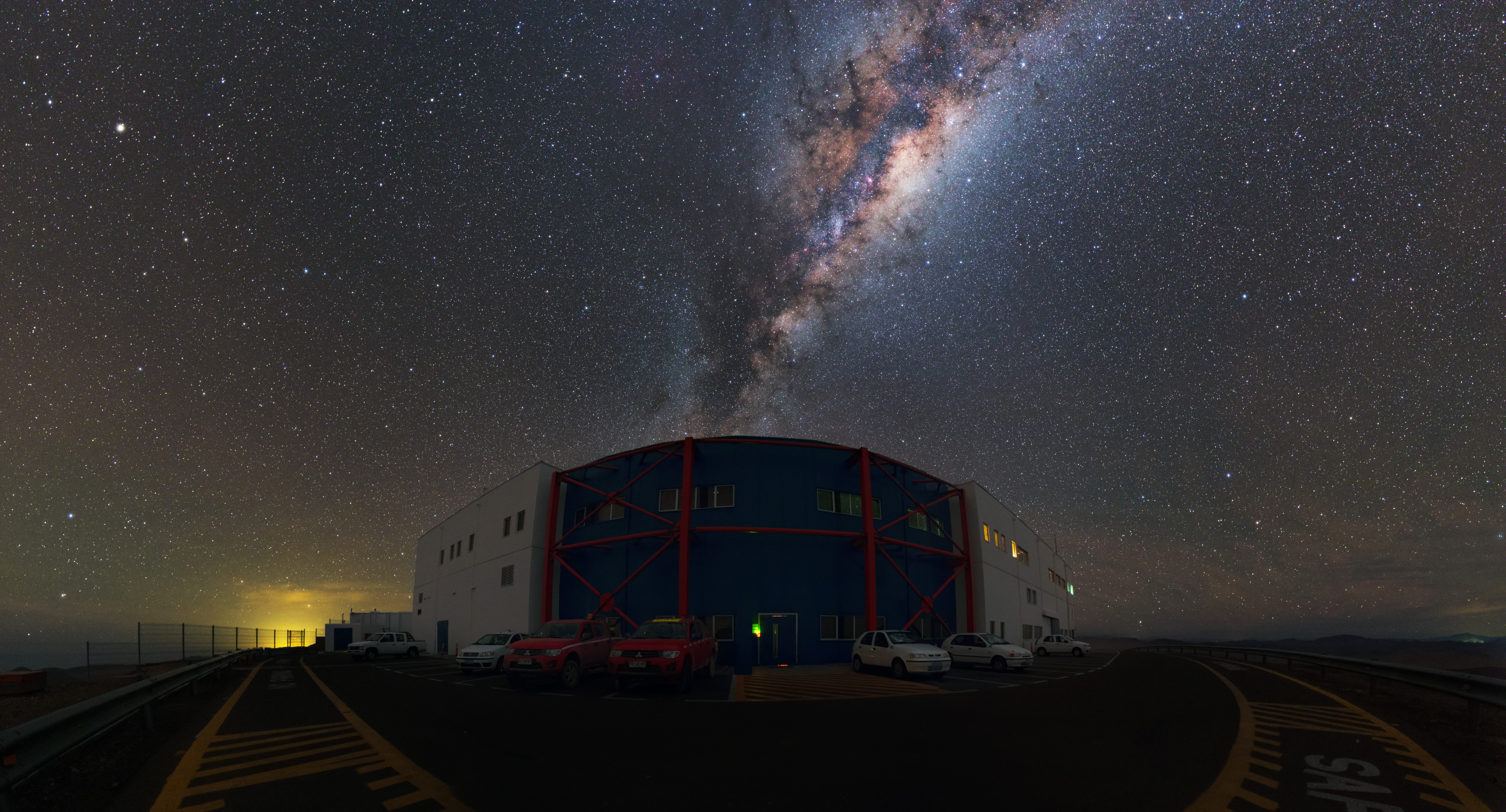
A dark-sky preserve status enables high-quality astronomical observation in Paranal Observatory.

A dark-sky preserve (DSP) is an area, usually surrounding a park or observatory, that restricts or reduces light pollution or maintains and protects naturally dark night skies. Different terms have been used to describe these areas as national organizations and governments have worked independently to create programs. DarkSky International (DarkSky) uses "International Dark Sky Reserve" (IDSR) and "International Dark Sky Park" (IDSP) among others when certifying Dark Sky Places.

== History ==
DarkSky International was founded in 1988 to reserve public or private land for an outlook of nocturnal territories and starry night skies. Dark-sky preserves are specifically conserved for their cultural, scientific, natural, or educational value and public enjoyment.

In 2007, the Mont Mégantic Observatory in Quebec was the first site to be certified as an International Dark Sky Reserve by DarkSky. The same year, Natural Bridges National Monument in Utah became the first International Dark Sky Park. The Gabriela Mistral Dark Sky Sanctuary in the Elqui Valley of Chile was designated as the world's first International Dark Sky Sanctuary in 2015.

A dark-sky preserve, or dark-sky reserve, should be sufficiently dark to promote astronomy. The lighting protocol for a dark-sky preserve is based on the sensitivity of wildlife to artificial light at night.

Canada has established an extensive and stringent standard for dark-sky preserves, that addresses lighting within dark-sky preserves and influences from skyglow from urban areas in the region. This was based on the work of the Royal Astronomical Society of Canada.

== Dark Sky Places ==
DarkSky International's Dark Sky Places program currently offers five types of designations:

- International Dark Sky Communities – Communities are legally organized cities and towns that adopt quality outdoor lighting ordinances and undertake efforts to educate residents about the importance of dark skies.
- International Dark Sky Parks – Parks are publicly or privately owned spaces protected for natural conservation that implement good outdoor lighting and provide dark sky programs for visitors.
- International Dark Sky Reserves – Reserves consist of a dark "core" zone surrounded by a populated periphery where policy controls are enacted to protect the darkness of the core. These sites are established by a partnership of multiple land managers.
- International Dark Sky Sanctuaries – Sanctuaries are the most remote (and often darkest) places in the world whose conservation state is most fragile. The geographic isolation of these places significantly limits opportunities for outreach, so this designation is designed to increase awareness of these sites and promote their long-term conservation.
- Urban Night Sky Places – These places do not qualify for designation within any other category but are recognized for their efforts to educate the public on the benefits of proper outdoor lighting that ensures safety while minimizing potential harm to the natural nighttime environment. Urban Night Sky Places can be municipal parks, open spaces, or similar properties near or surrounded by an urban environment, but whose planning and design actively promote an authentic nighttime experience in the midst of significant artificial light.

Dark Sky Developments of Distinction recognize subdivisions, master planned communities, and unincorporated neighborhoods and townships whose planning actively promotes a more natural night sky but does not qualify them for the International Dark Sky Community designation. This designation was retired in 2020.

Further designations include "Dark Sky Nation", given to the Kaibab Indian Reservation, and "Parashant International Night Sky Province-Window to the Cosmos", given to Grand Canyon-Parashant National Monument.

== Dark sky preserves, reserves, and parks ==
As of January 2023, there are 201 certified Dark Sky Places globally: 38 Communities, 115 Parks, 20 Reserves, 16 Sanctuaries, 6 Developments of Distinction and 6 Urban Night Sky Places.

Country	Name	Location	Area (in ha)	Bortle Scale	Status	Notes
Australia	The Jump-Up, Australian Age of Dinosaurs	Queensland	1,400	1–2	Dark Sky Sanctuary	Designated on April 27, 2019
Australia	Warrumbungle National Park	New South Wales	23,312	1	Dark Sky Park	Designated on July 4, 2016
Australia	Arkaroola Wilderness Sanctuary	South Australia	63,000		Dark Sky Sanctuary	Designated July 2023
Australia	River Murray Dark Sky Reserve	South Australia	320,000	2	Dark Sky Reserve	Designated October 2019 (gold tier)
Austria	Naturpark Attersee-Traunsee	Upper Austria	10,600	3	Dark Sky Park	Designated April 2021
Brazil	Desengano State Park	Rio de Janeiro	22,400	4	Dark Sky Park	Designated December 2021
Canada	Beaver Hills	Alberta	29,300	4.5	Dark Sky Preserve	Designated on September 3, 2006
Canada	Cypress Hills	Alberta / Saskatchewan	39,600	2		Designated on September 28, 2004
Canada	Jasper National Park	Alberta	1,122,800	1–2	Dark Sky Preserve	Designated on March 11, 2011
Canada United States	Waterton-Glacier International Peace Park	Alberta / Montana	460,600	3	Dark Sky Park	Designated April 2017
Canada	Wood Buffalo National Park	Alberta / NWT	4,480,700	1–2	UNESCO World Heritage; Dark Sky Preserve	Designated on June 28, 2013
Canada	Cattle Point	Oak Bay, British Columbia	5		Urban Star Park	Designated March 29, 2013
Canada	McDonald Park	British Columbia	5	2–3	Dark Sky Preserve	Designated in 2003
Canada	Fundy National Park	New Brunswick	20,700	2	Dark Sky Preserve	Designated on October 31, 2011
Canada	Irving Nature Park	Saint John, New Brunswick	243		Urban Star Park	Designated on July 1, 2011; First RASC-designated Urban Star Park
Canada	Kouchibouguac National Park	New Brunswick	23,920	2		Designated on June 6, 2009
Canada	Mount Carleton Provincial Park	New Brunswick	17,427	2		Designated on July 18, 2009
Canada	Kejimkujik National Park	Nova Scotia	40,400	2		Designated on August 7, 2010
Canada	Bluewater Outdoor Education Centre	Ontario	129	2		Designated on November 3, 2012, by the Royal Astronomical Society of Canada
Canada	Bruce Peninsula Fathom Five National Marine Park	Ontario	16,700	2–3		Designated on March 29, 2009
Canada	Gordon's Park	Ontario	43.7	2–3	Dark Sky Preserve	Designated on August 15, 2009; designation is only for the Park though Manitoulin Island (276,611 ha) follows dark-sky practices
Canada	Lake Superior Provincial Park	Ontario	155,600	1-2		Designated in July 2018
Canada	Killarney Provincial Park	Ontario	64,500	1-2		Designated in May 2018
Canada	North Frontenac Township	Ontario	116,000	1–2		Designated on August 3, 2013, first Municipality in Canada to achieve Dark Sky Preserve Status.
Canada	Point Pelee National Park	Ontario	2,000	3–4		Designated in 2006
Canada	Quetico Provincial Park	Ontario	471,800	2-3	Dark Sky Park	Designated February 2021
Canada	Torrance Barrens	Ontario	1,906	3		Designated in 1999; first Canadian dark sky preserve
Canada	Mont Mégantic Observatory	Quebec	527,500	2–3	Dark Sky Reserve	Designated Sept. 2007; first IDA International Dark-Sky Reserve
Canada	Parc du Mont-Bellevue	Quebec	159	5	Urban Night Sky Place	Designated September 2022
Canada	Mont-Tremblant National Park	Quebec	146,600		Dark Sky Park	Designated August 2023
Canada	Grasslands National Park	Saskatchewan	92,100	1		Designated on October 2, 2009
Chile	Gabriela Mistral	Elqui Valley	36,400		Dark Sky Sanctuary	Designated in 2015
Croatia	Jelsa	Hvar	12,120		Dark Sky Community	Designated 2022
Croatia	Petrova Gora-Biljeg		2,930		Dark Sky Park	Designated 2019
Croatia	Vrani kamen		8,000	2	Dark Sky Park	Designated 2019
Czech Republic; Slovakia	Beskydy Dark-Sky Park	Moravian-Silesian Region, Czech Republic; Čadca District, Slovakia	30,800	3–4		Designated on March 4, 2013; The second world's bilateral dark-sky park
Czech Republic	Manětín Dark-Sky Park	Plzeň Region	34,600	3–5		Designated on September 15, 2014
Czech Republic; Poland	Jizera Dark-Sky Park	Liberec Region, Czech Republic; Lower Silesia, Poland	7,500	3–4		Designated on November 4, 2009; the first European dark-sky park and the first world's bilateral dark-sky park
Denmark	Dark Sky Park Bulbjerg	Frøstrup	1,250	3	Dark Sky Park	Designated 2023
Denmark	Mandø		846		Dark Sky Park	Designated 2024
Denmark	Møn and Nyord	Zealand	1,100	2	Dark Sky Park	Designated 2017
France	Pic du Midi de Bigorre	Hautes-Pyrénées	311,200	2–4	Dark Sky Reserve	Designated an IDA International Dark Sky Reserve in December 2013; First IDA International Dark Sky Reserve in Europe.
France	Alpes Azur Mercantour	Beuil	225,000		Dark Sky Reserve	Designated in 2019.
France	Cévennes National Park	Cévennes	360,000		Dark Sky Reserve	Designated in 2018.
France	Regional Natural Park of Millevaches in Limousin	Millevaches	335,000		Dark Sky Reserve	Designated in 2021.
Germany	Winklmoosalm	Bavaria	79	2	Dark Sky Park	Designated May 2018
Germany	Westhavelland Nature Park	Brandenburg	152,900		Dark Sky Reserve	Designated an IDA International Dark Sky Reserve on February 12, 2014
Germany	Eifel National Park	North Rhine-Westphalia	10,700	2-3	Dark Sky Park	Designated 2014
Germany	Rhön Biosphere Reserve	Rhön Mountains	172,000	3	Dark Sky Reserve	Designated in 2014.
Greece	Aenos National Park	Cephalonia	2,860	3	Dark Sky Park	Designated June 2023
Hungary	Bükk National Park	Bükk Mountains	43,130	4	Dark Sky Park	Designated 2017
Hungary	Hortobágy Starry Sky Park	Various counties	10,000	3	Dark Sky Park	Designated on January 31, 2011; IDA's third international dark-sky park (Silver tier)
Hungary	Zselic National Landscape Protection Area	Somogy County / Baranya County	9,042	3	Dark Sky Park	Designated on November 16, 2009
India	Indian Astronomical Observatory	Hanle in Ladakh	70,000			Designated in September 2022.
Ireland	Kerry International Dark-Sky Reserve	Iveragh Peninsula, County Kerry	70,000	1–3	Dark Sky Reserve	Designated an IDA International Dark Sky Reserve on January 27, 2014
Israel	Makhtesh Ramon	Southern District	110,000	2–3	Dark Sky Park	Designated September 14, 2017
Japan	Minami-Rokuroshi	Fukui Prefecture	1,230		Urban Night Sky Place	Designated August 2023
Japan	Bisei Town, Ibara City	Okayama Prefecture	7271	4.5	Dark Sky Community	Designated November 2021
Japan	Iriomote-Ishigaki National Park	Okinawa Prefecture	40,658	4	Dark Sky Park	Designated April 2018
Japan	Kozushima Dark Sky Island	Oshima Subprefecture	1,858	2-3	Dark Sky Park	Designated November 2020
Mexico	Joya-La Barreta Ecological Park	Querétaro	245		Urban Night Sky Place	Designated September 2023
Mexico United States	Greater Big Bend International Dark Sky Reserve	Chihuahua / Coahuila / Texas	3,885,000	3	Dark Sky Reserve	Designated April 2022
Namibia	NamibRand Nature Reserve	Hardap Region	202,200		Dark Sky Reserve	Designated in 2012.
The Netherlands	De Boschplaat	Terschelling, Friesland	2,400	3	Dark Sky Park	Designated on October 7, 2016
The Netherlands	Lauwersmeer	Friesland	5,000	4	Dark Sky Park	Designated October 2016
New Zealand	Aoraki Mackenzie International Dark Sky Reserve	Aoraki / Mount Cook National Park, Mackenzie Basin, Lake Tekapo, Lake Pukaki	436,700	3	Dark Sky Reserve	Designated on June 9, 2012
New Zealand	Aotea / Great Barrier Island	Great Barrier Island	28,500	2	Dark Sky Sanctuary	Designated in 2017
New Zealand	Fiordland National Park	Southland, New Zealand	1,260,700		Dark Sky Park	Designated in 2026
New Zealand	Kaikōura Dark Sky Sanctuary	Kaikōura District	203,900	3	Dark Sky Sanctuary	Designated in 2024
New Zealand	Naseby, New Zealand	Central Otago District	8		Dark Sky Community	Designated in 2025
New Zealand	Oxford Forest Conservation Area	North Canterbury	11,350		Dark Sky Park	Designated in 2024
New Zealand	Stewart Island-Rakiura	Stewart Island	174,600	2	Dark Sky Sanctuary	Designated in 2019
New Zealand	Tāhuna Glenorchy Dark Sky Sanctuary	Queenstown-Lakes District	215,000	2	Dark Sky Sanctuary	Designated in 2025
New Zealand	Wai-iti Dark Sky Park	Tasman District	135	3	Dark Sky Park	Designated in 2020
New Zealand	Wairarapa Dark Sky Reserve	Wairarapa	366,500	2	Dark Sky Reserve	Designated in 2023
Niue	Niue	Niue	25,900	2	Dark Sky Sanctuary / Dark Sky Community	Designated in 2020. First whole country to become an International Dark Sky Place.
Poland	Bieszczady Starry-Sky Park	Subcarpathia	113,846	2–3		Designated on March 8, 2013
Poland	Sopotnia Wielka	Silesian Voivodeship			Dark Sky Community	Designated November 2023
Poland; Slovakia; Ukraine	East Carpathian Dark-Sky Tripark	Bieszczady Starry-Sky Park (Poland); Poloniny Dark-Sky Park (Slovakia); Transcarpathian Dark-Sky Park (Ukraine)	208,667	2–3		Designated on September 9, 2016; first world's trilateral dark-sky park
Slovakia	Poloniny Dark-Sky Park	Poloniny National Park	48,519	2–3		Designated on December 3, 2010
Slovakia	Veľká Fatra Dark-Sky Park	Veľká Fatra National Park (part of)	325	3–4		Designated on June 12, 2015
South Africa	!Ae!Hai Kalahari Heritage Park	Kgalagadi Transfrontier Park	95,000		Dark Sky Sanctuary	Designated in 2019
South Korea	Yeongyang Firefly Eco Park	North Gyeongsang Province, Yeongyang County	390	4	Dark Sky Park	Designated on November 1, 2015
Spain	Albanyà	Catalonia	9,440	2-3	Dark Sky Park	Designated June 2017
Ukraine	Transcarpathian Dark-Sky Park	Uzh National Nature Park	46,302	2		Designated on June 10, 2016
United Kingdom	Sark	Channel Islands	545	3	Dark Sky Community	Designated on January 31, 2011; IDA's first international dark-sky island (Silver tier)
United Kingdom	Bodmin Moor Dark Sky Landscape	Cornwall	43,400	3	Dark Sky Park	Designated July 2017
United Kingdom	West Penwith	Cornwall	13,584	3-4	Dark Sky Park	Designated December 2021
United Kingdom	Exmoor National Park	Devon / Somerset	18,100	3	Dark Sky Reserve	Designated October 10, 2011
United Kingdom	Cranborne Chase National Landscape	Dorset / Hampshire / Wiltshire	98,300	4-4.5	Dark Sky Reserve (Provisional)	Designated October 2019
United Kingdom	Moore’s Reserve	Hampshire / Sussex	162,700	4.5	Dark Sky Reserve	Designated May 2016
United Kingdom	OM Dark Sky Park and Observatory	Northern Ireland	1,402	1-2	Dark Sky Park	Designated September 2020
United Kingdom	Northumberland International Dark Sky Park	Northumberland	148,200	4	Dark Sky Park	Designated on December 9, 2013
United Kingdom	North York Moors National Park	North Yorkshire	143,600	4	Dark Sky Reserve	Designated December 2020
United Kingdom	Yorkshire Dales National Park	North Yorkshire	218,000	4-4.5	Dark Sky Reserve	Designated 2020
United Kingdom	Mata ki te Rangi (Eyes To the Sky)	Pitcairn Islands	4,325	1	Dark Sky Sanctuary	Designated March 18, 2019
United Kingdom	Galloway Forest Park	Scotland	75,000	3	Dark Sky Park	Designated on November 16, 2009
United Kingdom	Isle of Coll	Scotland	7,700	1	Dark Sky Community	Designated on December 9, 2013
United Kingdom	Moffat	Scotland	18,700	4	Dark Sky Community	Designated 2016
United Kingdom	North Ronaldsay Dark Sky Island	Scotland	700	5	Dark Sky Community	Designated 2021
United Kingdom	Tomintoul and Glenlivet – Cairngorms National Park	Scotland	24,400	3-4	Dark Sky Park	Designated 2018
United Kingdom	Bardsey Island (Ynys Enlli)	Wales	179	2	Dark Sky Sanctuary	Designated February 22, 2023
United Kingdom	Brecon Beacons (Bannau Brycheiniog) National Park	Wales	134,700	4	Dark Sky Reserve	Designated February 19, 2013
United Kingdom	Elan Valley Estate	Wales	18,000	3-4	Dark Sky Park	Designated 2015
United Kingdom	Snowdonia National Park (Eryri)	Wales	213,200	4	Dark Sky Reserve	Designated 2015
United Kingdom	Presteigne and Norton Dark Sky Community	Wales	4,000		Dark Sky Community	Designated 2023
United States	Chiricahua National Monument	Arizona	4,860	1	Dark Sky Park	Designated April 2021
United States	Flagstaff	Arizona	17,100	5	Dark Sky Community	Designated 2001, first Dark Sky Place certified by the IDA
United States	Sunset Crater Volcano National Monument / Walnut Canyon National Monument / Wupatki National Monument	Arizona	17,500	3	Dark Sky Park	Designated 2016
United States	Fountain Hills	Arizona	5,270	6	Dark Sky Community	Designated 2018
United States	Grand Canyon National Park	Arizona	493,100	1-2	Dark Sky Park	Designated June 2016
United States	Grand Canyon-Parashant National Monument	Arizona	404,700	1	Dark Sky Park	Designated 2014
United States	Kartchner Caverns State Park	Arizona	290	3	Dark Sky Park	Designated August 2017
United States	Oracle State Park	Arizona	1,619	4	Dark Sky Park	Designated 2014
United States	Petrified Forest National Park	Arizona	59,460	3	Dark Sky Park	Designated June 2018
United States	Pipe Spring National Monument	Arizona	16	3	Dark Sky Park	Designated March 2021
United States	Sedona	Arizona	4,970	4	Dark Sky Community	Designated 2014
United States	Anza-Borrego Desert State Park	California	237,100	4	Dark Sky Park	Designated January 2018
United States	Death Valley National Park	California	1,374,300	3	Dark Sky Park	Designated 2013
United States	Joshua Tree National Park	California	321,800	4	Dark Sky Park	Designated July 26, 2017
United States	Black Canyon of the Gunnison National Park	Colorado	12,440	3	Dark Sky Park	Designated 2015
United States	Curecanti National Recreation Area	Colorado	17,003	3	Dark Sky Park	Designated August 2021
United States	Dinosaur National Monument	Colorado / Utah	85,098	3	Dark Sky Park	Designated April 2019
United States	Florissant Fossil Beds National Monument	Colorado	2,427	4	Dark Sky Park	Designated June 2021
United States	Great Sand Dunes National Park and Preserve	Colorado	60,310	2	Dark Sky Park	Designated 2019
United States	Hovenweep National Monument	Colorado / Utah	310	2	Dark Sky Park	Designated 2014
United States	Jackson Lake State Park	Colorado	1,320	3-4	Dark Sky Park	Designated September 2020
United States	Lake Fork Earth and Sky Center	Colorado	24	2	Dark Sky Park	Designated September 2020
United States	Mesa Verde National Park	Colorado	21,200	3	Dark Sky Park	Designated April 2021
United States	Norwood	Colorado	104	5	Dark Sky Community	Designated 2019
United States	Top of the Pines	Colorado	71	2-3	Dark Sky Park	Designated November 2021
United States	Big Cypress National Preserve	Florida	290,000	3	Dark Sky Park	Designated 2016
United States	Kissimmee Prairie Preserve State Park	Florida	21,853	3	Dark Sky Park	Designated 2016
United States	Stephen C. Foster State Park	Georgia	32	2	Dark Sky Park	Designated November 2016
United States	Central Idaho Dark Sky Reserve	Idaho	366,742	3	Dark Sky Reserve	Designated December 2017
United States	Craters of the Moon National Monument	Idaho	303,500	3	Dark Sky Park	Designated August 2017
United States	Middle Fork River Forest Preserve	Illinois	688	4	Dark Sky Park	Designated 2018
United States	Potawatomi Wildlife Park	Indiana	116	4.5	Dark Sky Preserve	Designated in 2003
United States	Appalachian Mountain Club’s Maine Woods	Maine	29,900	3	Dark Sky Park	Designated May 2021
United States	Katahdin Woods and Waters National Monument	Maine	35,400	3	Dark Sky Sanctuary	Designated May 2020
United States	Beaver Island State Wildlife Research Area	Michigan	3,720		Dark Sky Sanctuary	Designated April 2024
United States	Dr. T.K. Lawless County Park	Michigan	340	4.5	Dark Sky Park	Designated January 2020
United States	The Headlands	Michigan	220	4	Dark Sky Park	Designated in 2011
United States	Keweenaw Dark Sky Park	Michigan	226	3	Dark Sky Park	Designated in June 2022
United States	Lake Hudson State Recreation Area	Michigan	890	3	Dark Sky Preserve	Designated in 1993
United States	Negwegon State Park	Michigan	1,513		Dark Sky Preserve	Designated in 2016
United States	Port Crescent State Park	Michigan	2,400	3	Dark Sky Preserve	Designated in 2012
United States	Rockport Recreation Area	Michigan	4,800		Dark Sky Preserve	Designated in 2016
United States	Thompson's Harbor State Park	Michigan	2,068	2	Dark Sky Preserve	Designated in 2016
United States	Wilderness State Park	Michigan	4,254	2	Dark Sky Preserve	Designated in 2012
United States	Boundary Waters Canoe Area Wilderness	Minnesota	440,000	1	Dark Sky Sanctuary	Designated in 2020
United States	Voyageurs National Park	Minnesota	88,200	4	Dark Sky Park	Designated in 2020
United States	Lost Trail National Wildlife Refuge	Montana	3,730		Dark Sky Sanctuary	Designated October 2022
United States	Medicine Rocks State Park	Montana	140	1	Dark Sky Park	Designated December 2020
United States	Merritt Reservoir State Recreation Area	Nebraska	295	3-4	Dark Sky Park	Designated 2022
United States	Great Basin National Park	Nevada	31,230	1	Dark Sky Park	Designated in 2016
United States	Massacre Rim Wilderness Study Area	Nevada	40,990	2-3	Dark Sky Sanctuary	Designated April 2019
United States	Capulin Volcano National Monument	New Mexico	320	2	Dark Sky Park	Designated August 2016
United States	Chaco Culture National Historical Park	New Mexico	13,759	2–3	Dark Sky Park	Designated on August 28, 2013
United States	Clayton Lake State Park	New Mexico	79.6	3	Dark Sky Park	Designated June 29, 2010
United States	El Morro National Monument	New Mexico	517	3	Dark Sky Park	Designated December 2019
United States	Fort Union National Monument	New Mexico	290	2-3	Dark Sky Park	Designated September 2019
United States	Salinas Pueblo Missions National Monument	New Mexico	399	2	Dark Sky Park	Designated September 2016
United States	Tonto National Monument	New Mexico	450	4-4.5	Dark Sky Park	Designated May 2019
United States	Tumacácori National Historical Park	New Mexico	150	4-4.5	Dark Sky Park	Designated May 2018
United States	Valle de Oro National Wildlife Refuge	New Mexico	230	6	Urban Night Sky Place	Designated October 2019
United States	Valles Caldera National Preserve	New Mexico	36100	3	Dark Sky Park	Designated February 2021
United States	Pisgah Astronomical Research Institute	North Carolina	81	3	Dark Sky Park	Designated September 2020
United States	Geauga Observatory Park	Ohio	450	4	Dark Sky Park	Designated on August 20, 2011
United States	Oregon Outback	Oregon	1,007,421		Dark Sky Sanctuary	Designated on March 11, 2024
United States	Prineville Reservoir State Park	Oregon	120	2-3	Dark Sky Park	Designated May 2021
United States	Cherry Springs State Park	Pennsylvania	430	2	Dark Sky Park	Designated as a State DSP in 2000 by the Pennsylvania DCNR; Designated as an International DSP on June 11, 2007, by the IDA.
United States	Bee Cave	Texas	2,221	9	Dark Sky Community	Designated 2023
United States	Big Bend National Park	Texas	324,219	3-4	Dark Sky Park	Designated February 11, 2012
United States	Big Bend Ranch State Park	Texas	125,800	2-3	Dark Sky Park	Designated November 2017
United States	Black Gap Wildlife Management Area	Texas	41,680	3	Dark Sky Sanctuary	Designated August 2021
United States	Copper Breaks State Park	Texas	782	3	Dark Sky Park	Designated August 6, 2014
United States	Devils River State Natural Area — Del Norte Unit	Texas	8,030	2-3	Dark Sky Sanctuary	Designated January 2019
United States	Dripping Springs	Texas	30,300	5	Dark Sky Community	Designated February 11, 2014
United States	Enchanted Rock State Natural Area	Texas	682	2	Dark Sky Park	Designated August 6, 2014
United States	Lyndon B. Johnson National Historical Park	Texas	640	3	Dark Sky Park	Designated November 2021
United States	Milton Reimers Ranch Park	Texas	982	4.5	Dark Sky Park	Designated November 2021
United States	UBarU Camp and Retreat Center	Texas	57.5	2–3	Dark Sky Park	Designated in 2015; only DSP in the USA on private land
United States	Antelope Island State Park	Utah	11,660	4.5	Dark Sky Park	Designated April 2017
United States	Arches National Park	Utah	31,000	3-4	Dark Sky Park	Designated July 2019
United States	Bryce Canyon National Park	Utah	14,500	2-3	Dark Sky Park	Designated August 2019
United States	Canyonlands National Park	Utah	136,500	2-3	Dark Sky Park	Designated August 2015
United States	Capitol Reef National Park	Utah	99,000	1	Dark Sky Park	Designated April 2015
United States	Cedar Breaks National Monument	Utah	2,490	3	Dark Sky Park	Designated March 2017
United States	Dead Horse Point State Park	Utah	2,170	3	Dark Sky Park	Designated June 2016
United States	East Canyon State Park	Utah	295	4	Dark Sky Park	Designated August 2020
United States	Fremont Indian State Park	Utah	486	2-3	Dark Sky Park	Designated March 2021
United States	Goblin Valley State Park	Utah	4,012	3-4	Dark Sky Park	Designated September 2016
United States	Goosenecks State Park	Utah	40	4	Dark Sky Park	Designated March 2021
United States	Jordanelle State Park	Utah	2,710	4.5	Dark Sky Park	Designated January 2021
United States	Natural Bridges National Monument	Utah	3,090	2	Dark Sky Park	Designated in 2007; first international dark-sky park
United States	North Fork Park	Utah	1,000	4.5	Dark Sky Park	Designated 2015
United States	Rainbow Bridge National Monument	Utah	41,400	5	Dark Sky Park	Designated April 2018
United States	Rockport State Park	Utah	480	4	Dark Sky Park	Designated January 2021
United States	Timpanogos Cave National Monument	Utah	100	5	Urban Night Sky Place	Designated September 2020
United States	Zion National Park	Utah	58,800	3	Dark Sky Park	Designated June 2021
United States	Sky Meadows State Park	Virginia	754	4.5	Dark Sky Park	Designated April 2021
United States	Goldendale Observatory	Washington	2		Dark Sky Park	Designated June 29, 2010
United States	Watoga State Park	West Virginia	4,087		Dark Sky Park	Designated in 2021
United States	Newport State Park	Wisconsin	960	3	Dark Sky Park	Designated in 2017

== Protected zones ==
=== Around observatories ===
Name	Country	Radius (in km)
Mount John University Observatory	New Zealand	37
Kitt Peak	US	56
Mont Mégantic Observatory	Canada	50
Palomar Observatory	US	48
Mount Hopkins	US	40
Monte Ekar Observatory	Italy	30
Asiago Astrophysical Observatory	Italy	30
Mount Laguna	US	24
Observatoire de Haute-Provence	France	15
Ondřejov Observatory	Czech Republic	10
Kleť	Czech Republic	10
Dominion Astrophysical Observatory	Canada	5
McDonald Observatory	US	92
Molėtai Astronomical Observatory	Lithuania	3.5

=== Other ===
Some regions, like the following, are protected without any reference to an observatory or a park.

- Regions of Coquimbo, Atacama, and Antofagasta in northern Chile
- The island of La Palma of the Canary Islands
- The Big Island of Hawaii
- Florida beach communities restrict lighting on beaches, to preserve hatchling sea turtles.

== By country ==
=== Canada ===
In the Canadian program, lighting within the area must be strictly controlled to minimize the impact of artificial lighting on wildlife. These guidelines are more stringent than in other countries that lack the extensive wilderness areas that still exist in Canada. The management of a Canadian DSP extends their outreach programs from the public that visit the site to include the promotion of better lighting policies in surrounding urban areas. Currently, dark-sky preserves have more control over internal and external lighting than other programs.

With the increase in regional light pollution, some observatories have actively worked with cities in their region to establish protection zones where there is controlled light pollution. These areas may not yet have been declared dark-sky preserves.

Although dark-sky preserve designations are generally sought by astronomers, it is clear that preserving natural darkness has positive effects on the health of nocturnal wildlife within the parks. For example, the nocturnal black-footed ferret was reintroduced to the Grasslands National Park dark-sky preserve and the success of the reintroduction is enhanced by the pristine natural darkness maintained within the park by the DSP agreement.

=== Scotland ===
The island of Rùm in the Hebrides was declared a Dark Sky Sanctuary in 2024. The island has a small population who value the dark sky, and know that too much artificial light negatively affects the young of the Manx Shearwater birds that breed on the island. The local population worked to gain this designation. It is the second such designation in Europe, and the first in Scotland.

== See also ==
- Astrotourism
- Arizona Sky Village
- Noctcaelador
- Noctourism
- Scotobiology
- DarkSky International
- Dark-Sky Movement
- United States National Radio Quiet Zone
