= Dark-sky movement =

Campaign against light pollution

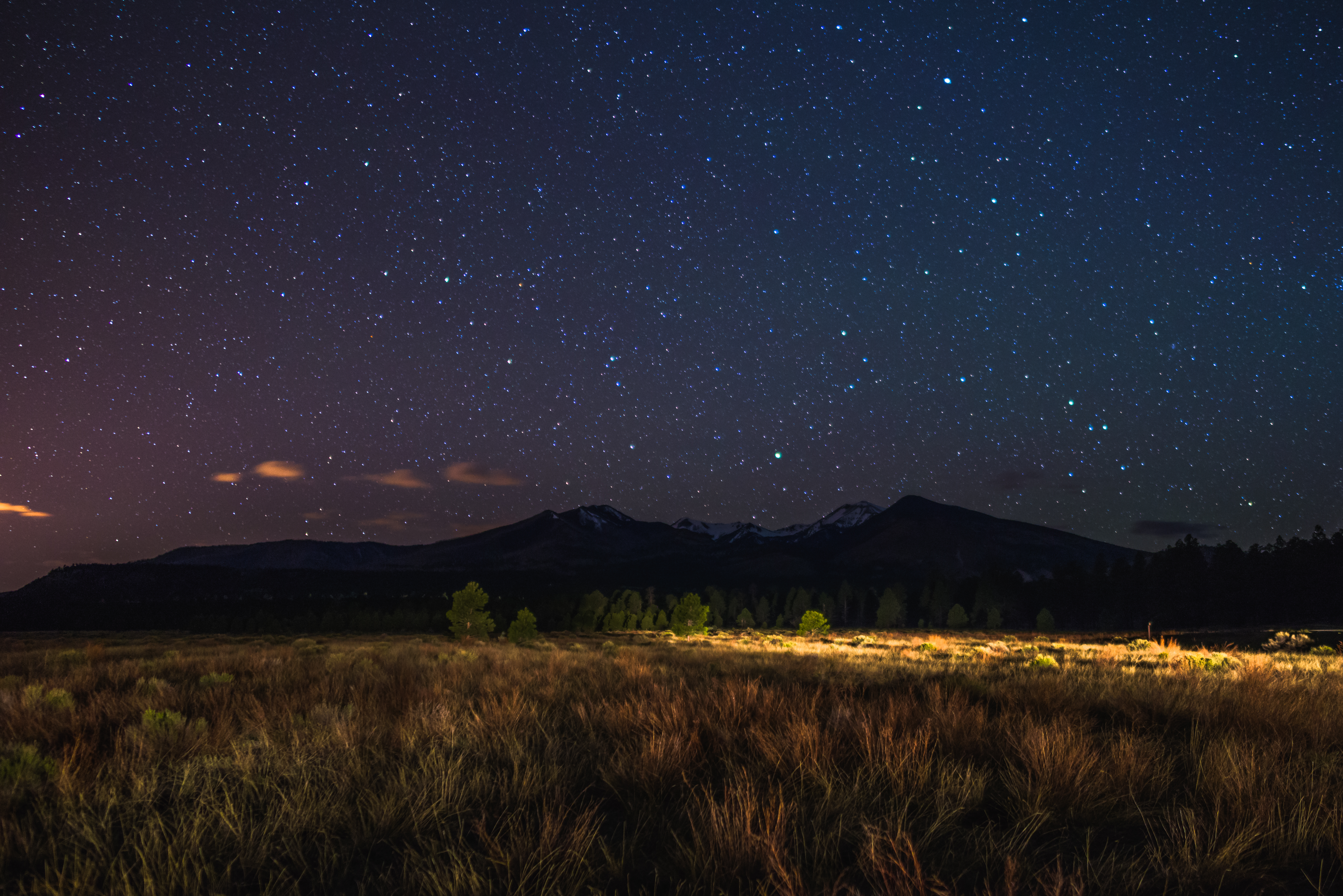
Clear night skies are the goal of the dark-sky movement; Bonito Park, near Flagstaff, Arizona.

The dark-sky movement is a campaign to reduce light pollution. The advantages of reducing light pollution include an increased number of stars visible at night, reducing the effects of electric lighting on the environment, improving the well-being, health and safety of people and wildlife, and cutting down on energy usage. Earth Hour and International Dark-Sky Week are two examples of such efforts.

The movement started with professional and amateur astronomers alarmed that nocturnal skyglow from urban areas was blotting out the sight of stars. For example, the world-famous Palomar Observatory in California is threatened by sky-glow from the nearby city of Escondido and local businesses. For similar reasons, astronomers in Arizona helped push the governor there to veto a bill in 2012 that would have lifted a ban on illuminated billboards.

Nocturnal animals can be harmed by light pollution because they are biologically evolved to be dependent on an environment with a certain number of hours of uninterrupted daytime and nighttime. The over-illumination of the night sky is affecting these organisms (especially birds). This biological study of darkness is called scotobiology. Light pollution has also been found to affect human circadian rhythms.

The dark-sky movement encourages the use of full-cutoff fixtures that cast little or no light upward in public areas and generally to encourage communities to adopt lighting regulations. A 2011 project is to establish "dark sky oasis" in suburban areas.

== Dark-sky lighting ==
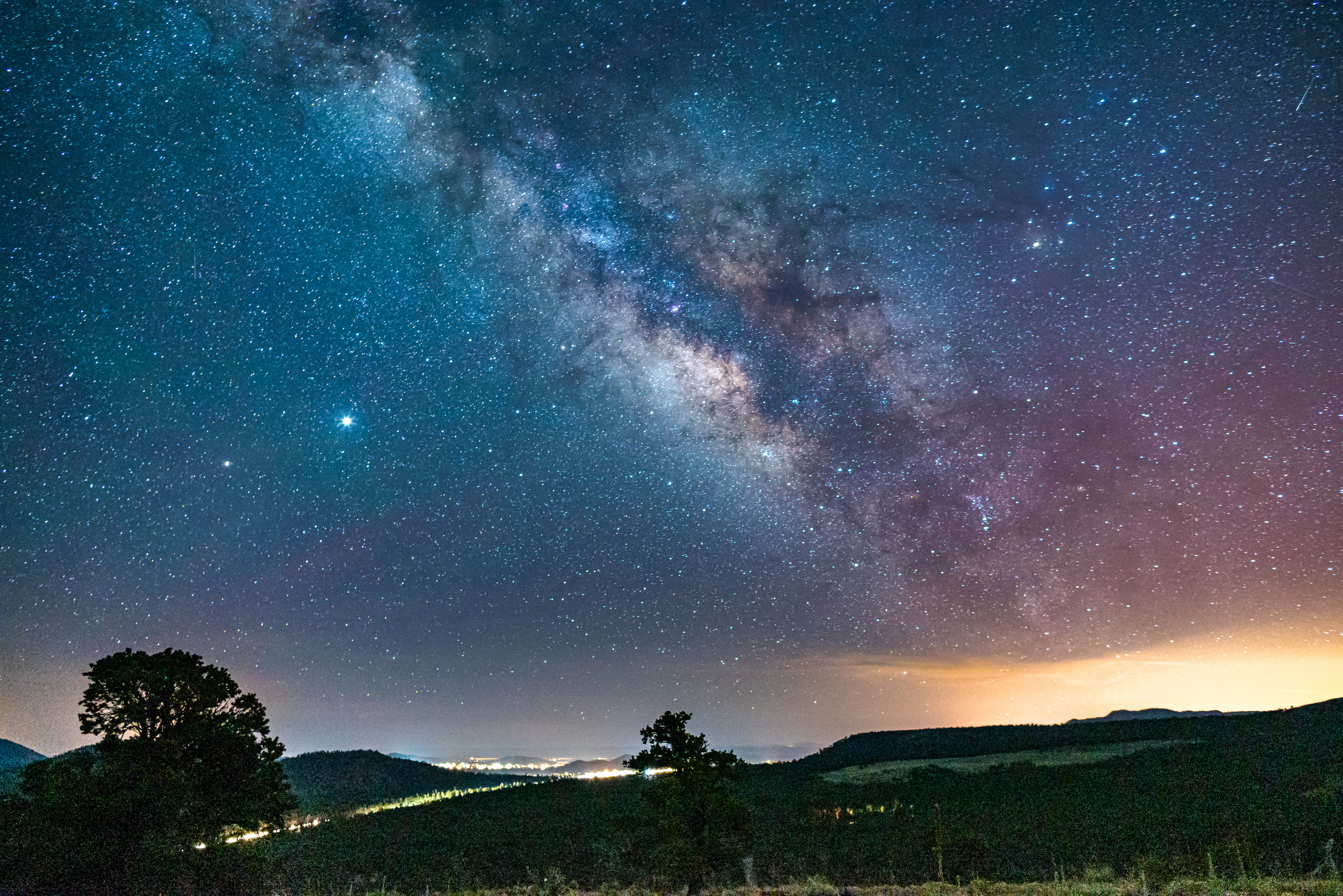
San Francisco Peaks at sunset, just north of Flagstaff.

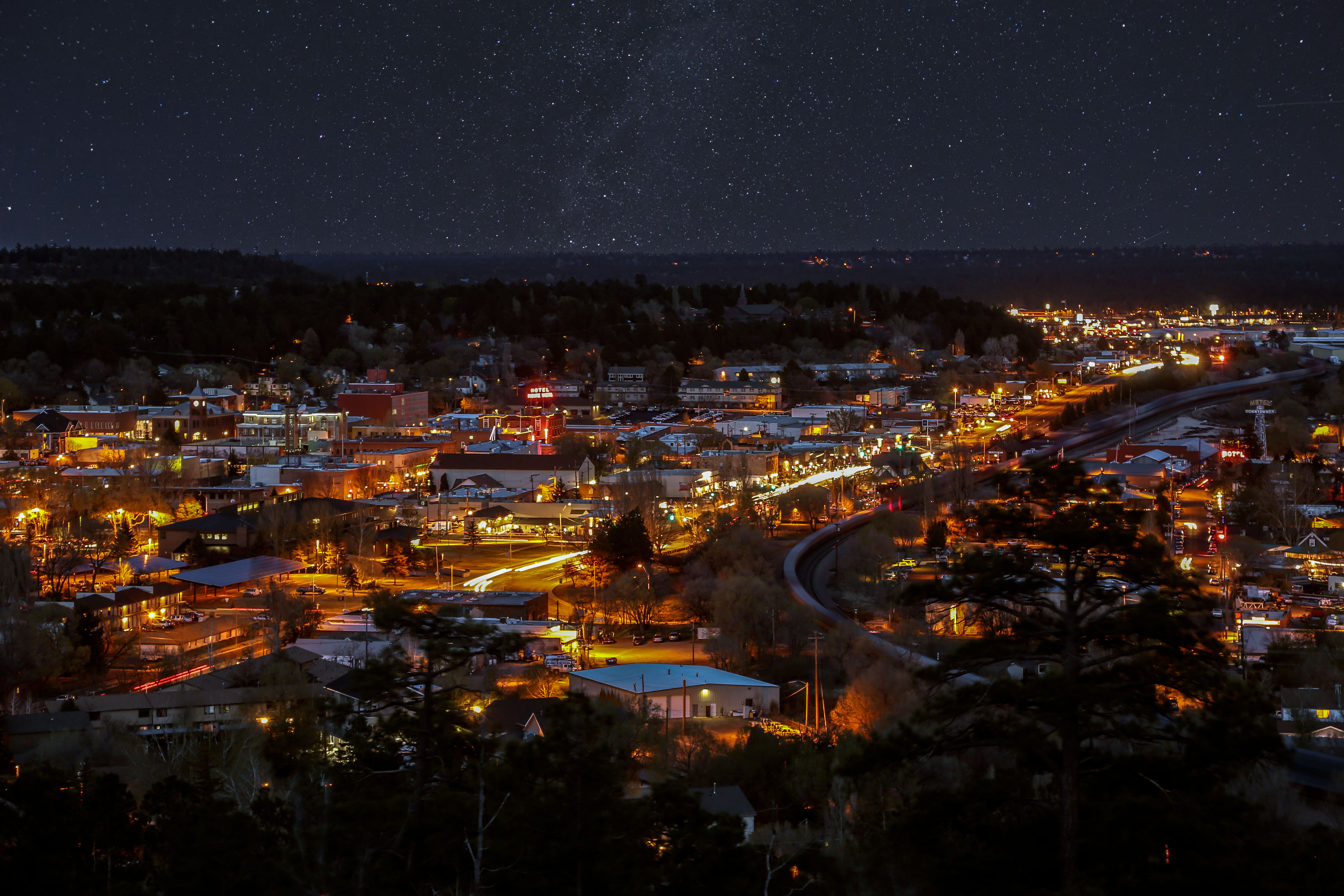
The city of Flagstaff, Arizona uses effectively controlled lighting to minimize light pollution while keeping the ground visible.

Dark-sky lighting is a concept important to the dark-sky movement, as it minimizes light pollution. The concept was started in the 1950s by the city of Flagstaff, Arizona. Flagstaff is a city of over 70,000 people, but because of its effectively controlled lighting, the skies are dark enough to see the Milky Way, and the light dome over the city viewed from some distance has been measured as less than 10% as bright as that over a similarly sized city (Cheyenne, Wyoming) that has not sought to protect its night skies. Lights should be shielded on the top and sides so light doesn't go up to the sky and only used when needed (use motion detectors and only the wattage necessary). To minimize the visual brightness of skyglow and reduce glare and most other biological impacts, amber-colored lighting is critical (such as formerly high- and low-pressure sodium, or now amber LED. DarkSky International certifies fixtures as dark sky friendly, and these will have the DarkSky Approved seal.

== Skyglow ==
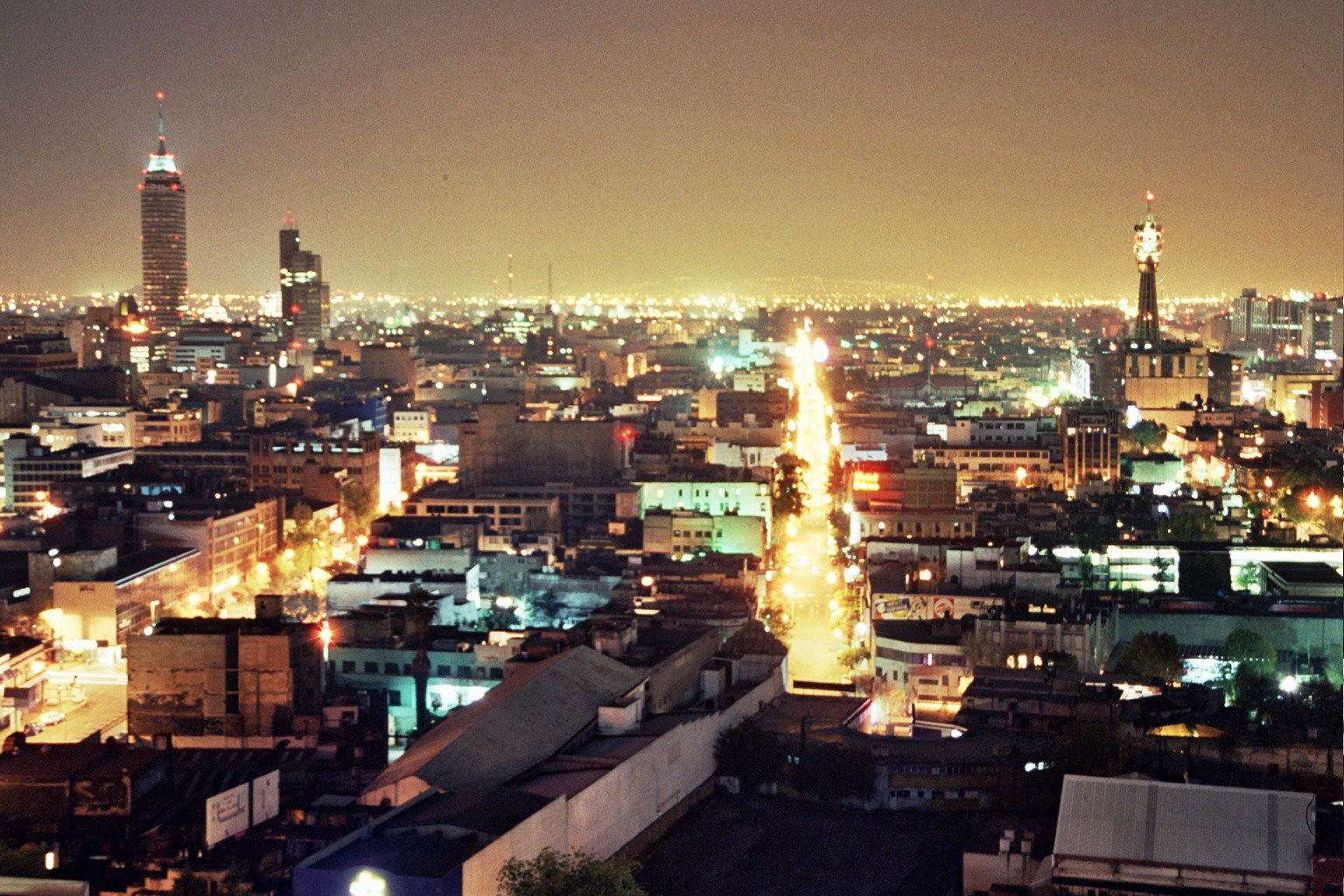
Mexico City at night, showing skyglow bright enough to read a book outside.

Skyglow is the illumination of the night sky or parts of it, resembling an orange "smog". It occurs from both natural and human-made sources. Artificial skyglow is caused by the over-illumination of the sky from large city centres, shopping centres, or stadiums. It consists of light that is either emitted directly upward or reflected from the ground that is then scattered by dust and gas molecules in the atmosphere, producing a luminous background or light dome. These artificial skyglows cause the sky to be up to 100 times brighter in urban areas than a naturally dark sky that is unaffected by artificial light. Natural skyglow can come from natural light sources, such as the Sun, the Moon, the stars, or auroras.

Some communities are becoming aware of this problem and are putting forth efforts to minimize the hazy, orange skyglow. A community in particular is the city of Merritt, British Columbia. An article published July 8, 2010 states that they are making minor changes to lighting in and around Merritt, such as the installment of down-cast lighting to commercial buildings, as part of their light pollution abatement program. The benefits of this technological change include "saving energy through better focused lights, preserving the environment by reducing excess light that may affect flora and fauna, reducing crime and increasing safety by more adequately illuminating areas, and reducing health risks."

== Scotobiology ==
Scotobiology is the study of the role darkness plays in living organisms. It shows that the interruption of darkness by light pollution creates drastic effects for most organisms, changing their food gathering and feeding habits, their mating and reproduction behavior, or their migration behavior (in birds and insects) and social behavior. Approximately 30% of vertebrates and 60% of invertebrates are nocturnal, meaning that they depend on darkness. Their everyday behaviors are biologically evolved to adapt in uninterrupted darkness.

== Dark-sky preserves ==
Dark-sky preserves are the main contributors to the dark-sky movement. They are protected areas commonly found in national parks or remote regions having a zero light pollution policy.

As of 2025, there are 200 worldwide locations covering over 160,000 km^{2} (62,000 sq mi) of protected land and night skies in 22 countries on 6 continents. One such community preserve in the United States is called the Arizona Sky Village, an astronomy-oriented location in Portal, Arizona.

The Dark Sky Places program has the intent to restore the nighttime environment and protect communities and wildlife with clear night skies having importance to nature, education, culture, and history. A list of designated dark sky places is maintained by DarkSky International and the Dark Skies Advisory Group of the International Union for Conservation of Nature.

== DarkSky International ==
DarkSky International, formerly the International Dark-Sky Association (IDA), began in 1988. A non-profit, it manages the Fixture Seal of Approval program, which offers a third-party rating system judging the "sky-friendliness" of lighting fixtures. Another outreach effort is the Dark Sky Places program, created after a proposal from the Flagstaff Dark Skies Coalition in 2001 and the recognition of Flagstaff as the first International Dark-Sky Community in October 2001. As of 2025, DarkSky International recognizes over 200 Dark Sky Places worldwide. In 2009, the IDA opened an office for public policy and government affairs in Washington, D.C. to inform lawmakers and lobbyists about the energy efficiency of outdoor lighting and to promote the adoption of energy-saving measures. DarkSky International advances dark sky awareness and protection through promotion of guidelines developed in collaboration with lighting industry partners (e.g. IESNA). The principles of responsible outdoor lighting are:

- Meets the needs of people to see at night
- Conserves energy
- Avoids harmful effects on wildlife
- Protects our night sky

== List of groups ==
- Campaign for Dark Skies (UK)
- Canadian Geographic (Canada)
- CieloBuio (Italy)
- International Dark-Sky Association
- National Dark-Sky Week (United States)
- Niue
- Royal Astronomical Society of Canada (Canada)

== See also ==
- Astrotourism
- Bortle dark-sky scale
- SKYGLOW
- Dark-sky preserve
- Noctcaelador
- Dark infrastructure
