= Astrotourism in India =

Astrotourism, in which tourists visit astronomical observatories, is a developing part of the Indian tourism industry.

== Locations ==
There are many astrotourism attractions in India; these include Ladakh, Himachal Pradesh, Uttarakhand, and the Andaman and Nicobar Islands. Among these, Uttarakhand has the highest number of night-sky observatories, such as Aryabhatta Research Institute of Observational Sciences (ARIES) in Devasthal, Nainital district. The Government of Uttarakhand is setting up observatories at Abbott Mount in Champawat district, Pithoragarh, Kausani, Jadhang (or Jadung, under the Vibrant Villages programme), and Takula in Nainital. In Uttarakhand, a startup named Starscapes operates private astrotourism observatories at Bhimtal, Kausani, and astrovillage Benital in Chamoli district.

There are more than 100 planetaria in India. Nehru Planetarium is based in five locations at Mumbai, New Delhi, Pune, Bangalore, and Prayagraj. The Kalpana Chawla Planetarium is in Jyotisar, Kurukshetra, Haryana. The Starscapes observatory at Mukteshwar in the Kumaon hills of Uttarakhand is known for stargazing. There are also some stargazing camps organised in Sandhan, Maharashtra.

In 2023, India had more than 15 private observatories for astrotourism that opened in the previous five years, many of which have observatories in multiple locations. Astrostays, a startup, organises astrotourism trips to Pangong in Ladakh. In Karnataka, the Association of Bangalore Amateur Astronomers (ABAA) meets every Sunday at the Nehru Planetarium, and Bangalore Astronomical Society (BAS) organizes regular astrotours to the outskirts of cities and to remote locations. Starvoirs, a Chennai-based startup, owns private nine observatories in India, including sites at Rameshwaram, Chidambaram, Kodanad, the Andaman Islands, and Nagaland.

== Development ==
Astrotourism in India is underused and underdeveloped. Numerous sites in India could be developed and designated as dark-sky preserves. For example, Madikeri in Coorg is surrounded by coffee plantations and natural forests, and rates 3 (rural sky) on the Bortle scale. The conservation of dark skies could help conservation of ecology and nocturnal animals, but there is very low awareness of this in India. The designation of dark-sky preserves by the International Dark-Sky Association (IDA) is a three-year process in which dark-sky areas are identified, a development and conservation plan is prepared, and a proposal is submitted to IDA. There is no nationwide plan to systematically develop more dark-sky areas with mandatory lighting restrictions.
