= Minicoy Thundi Beach =

Beach in Lakshadweep, India

Minicoy Thundi Beach is located on the island of Minicoy in Lakshadweep, India. The beach has been given the Blue Flag award. The beach is characterized by its white sand and turquoise blue waters of the lagoon.

== See also ==
- Blue Flag beach
- Lakshadweep
- Tourism in India
