= Kalec =

- Village
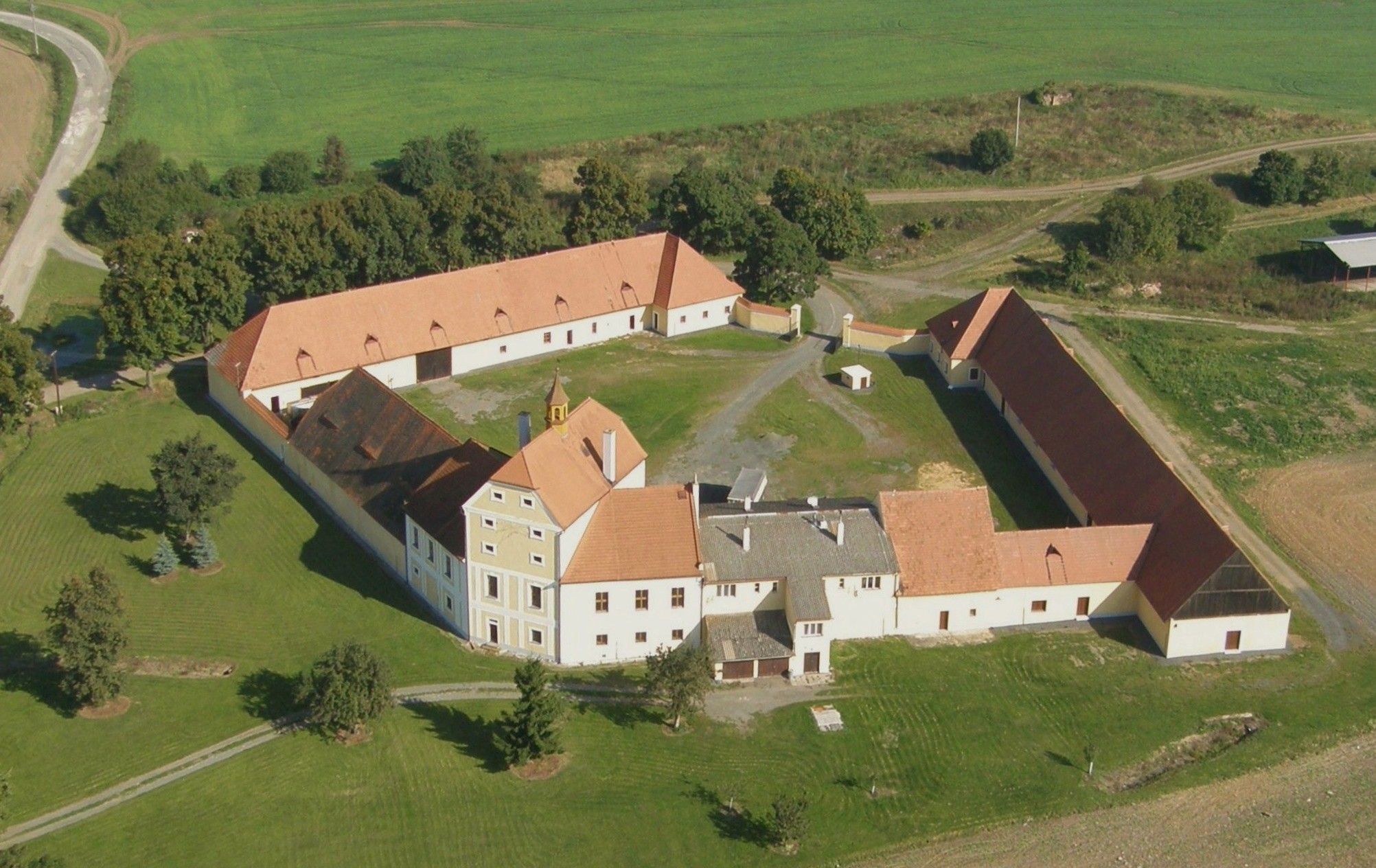
- Aerial view

- Location in the Czech Republic
- Coordinates: 50°1′18″N 13°19′43″E
- Country: Czech Republic
- Region: Plzeň
- District: Plzeň-North
- Municipality: Žihle
- First mentioned: 1234

Area
  - Total: 4.47 km^{2} (1.73 sq mi)
- Elevation: 520 m (1,710 ft)

Population (2021)
  - Total: 0
  - Density: 0.0/km^{2} (0.0/sq mi)
- Time zone: UTC+1 (CET)
  - Summer (DST): UTC+2 (CEST)
- Postal code: 331 65

Kalec is a village and municipal part of Žihle in Plzeň-North District in the Plzeň Region of the Czech Republic. Since the 1990s, the village has no permanent inhabitants. The village was the site of several important events in the history of Bohemia.

== History ==
Kalec's origins begin in the 13th century, it was a modest establishment with a bunker, inhabited by families of the low nobility formed during the middle age. Kalecs steps to be a part of the monastery in Plasy caused disputes between several feudal entities until 1346. In the 14th century, the monastery began to acquire properties in this establishment. During the period of the Thirty Years' War, Kalec was occupied several times by the Swedish army.

In 1785, Kalec, after the approval from the Church, went to the dominions of Manětín and for the beginning of the 19th century it became part of Rabštejn nad Střelou. However, in 1787, the property was acquired by the Lazanský family.

With the formation of the Czechoslovakia state in 1918, the property was expropriated, and put under an agrarian reform which was put into the hands of a cooperative. In 1934, the property was acquired by Jaroslav Brček, an industrialist from Plzeň.

At the beginning of World War II, Kalec was annexed by Nazi Germany and administered as part of the Reichsgau Sudetenland.

== Demographics ==
Historical population

Year	Pop.	±%
1869	75	—
1880	84	+12.0%
1890	84	+0.0%
1900	75	−10.7%
1910	75	+0.0%

Year	Pop.	±%
1921	97	+29.3%
1930	62	−36.1%
1950	32	−48.4%
1961	35	+9.4%
1970	43	+22.9%

Year	Pop.	±%
1980	18	−58.1%
1991	7	−61.1%
2001	0	−100.0%
2011	0	0.00%
2021	0	0.00%

Source: Censuses

== Sights ==
The last remnant of the village is the Kalec Farmyard, protected as a cultural monument. It was built in the Baroque style in 1715–1716. It was built during the era of Abbot Evžen Tyttl for the purposes of the Plasy Monastery, probably according to the design by Jan Santini Aichel. The main building is called Kalec Castle. Part of the farmyard is also the Chapel of Saint Margaret. Today the farmyard is privately owned, but still serves agricultural purposes.
