= Noctcaelador =

Psychological construct

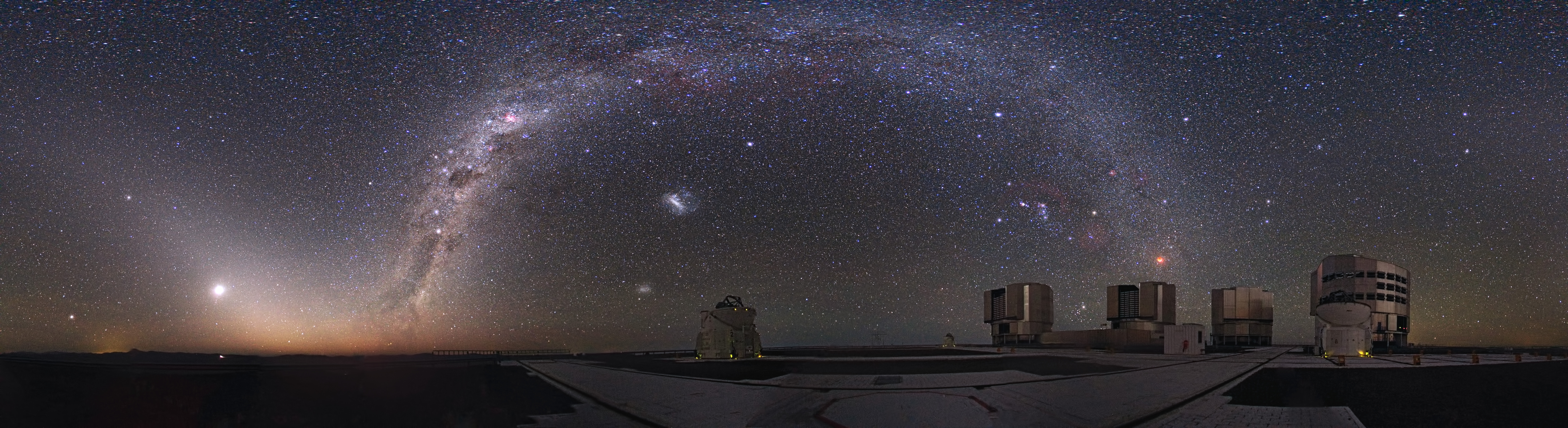
The night sky without light pollution over Paranal Observatory in the Atacama Desert

Noctcaelador (from Latin nocturnus "nocturnal", caelum "sky", and adorare "to adore") is a psychological construct, introduced by the psychologist William E. Kelly in 2003 to describe an "emotional attachment to, or adoration of, the night sky".

According to Kelly, "noctcaelador has been associated with higher openness to experience, investigative and artistic vocational interests, sensation-seeking, a rational, cognitive approach to problem solving and need for cognition, a propensity to engage in fantasy, a tendency to become deeply involved and attentive to stimuli of interest, and a willingness to consider unusual ideas and possibilities".

== History ==
In a series of lectures in the United States, the philosopher George Santayana used the appearance of the night sky as an example of what is attractive to the human mind: an intricacy delicately poised between unfathomable complexity and uninteresting simplicity. Because of the absence of light pollution in antiquity, stars of the sixth apparent magnitude were more widely visible to the naked eye. American philosopher Holmes Rolston III juxtaposed the ancient aesthetics of the night sky and the modern one: "Today, we are almost amused at the way the ancients fancied various constellations there. At night, we no longer admire the Orion as a hunter, any more than by day do we admire a cumulus cloud as a basket of washing".

== Comparison with astronality ==
Astronism, a cosmocentric new religious movement founded in 2013, includes as part of its philosophy the notion that exposure to the night sky incites an emotion in humans called astronality which acts as the impetus for religious or spiritual experience associated with outer space and astronomical phenomena.

== See also ==
- Dark-sky movement
- National Dark-Sky Week
- Noctourism
- International Dark-Sky Association
- Overview effect
