= Scotobiology =

Study of biological effects of darkness

Scotobiology is the study of biology as directly and specifically affected by darkness, as opposed to photobiology, which describes the biological effects of light.

== Overview ==
The science of scotobiology gathers together under a single descriptive heading a wide range of approaches to the study of the biology of darkness. This includes work on the effects of darkness on the behavior and metabolism of animals, plants, and microbes. Some of this work has been going on for over a century, and lays the foundation for understanding the importance of dark night skies, not only for humans but for all biological species.

The great majority of biological systems have evolved in a world of alternating day and night and have become irrevocably adapted to and dependent on the daily and seasonally changing patterns of light and darkness. Light is essential for many biological activities such as sight and photosynthesis. These are the focus of the science of photobiology. But the presence of uninterrupted periods of darkness, as well as their alternation with light, is just as important to biological behaviour. Scotobiology studies the positive responses of biological systems to the presence of darkness, and not merely the negative effects caused by the absence of light.

== Effects of darkness ==
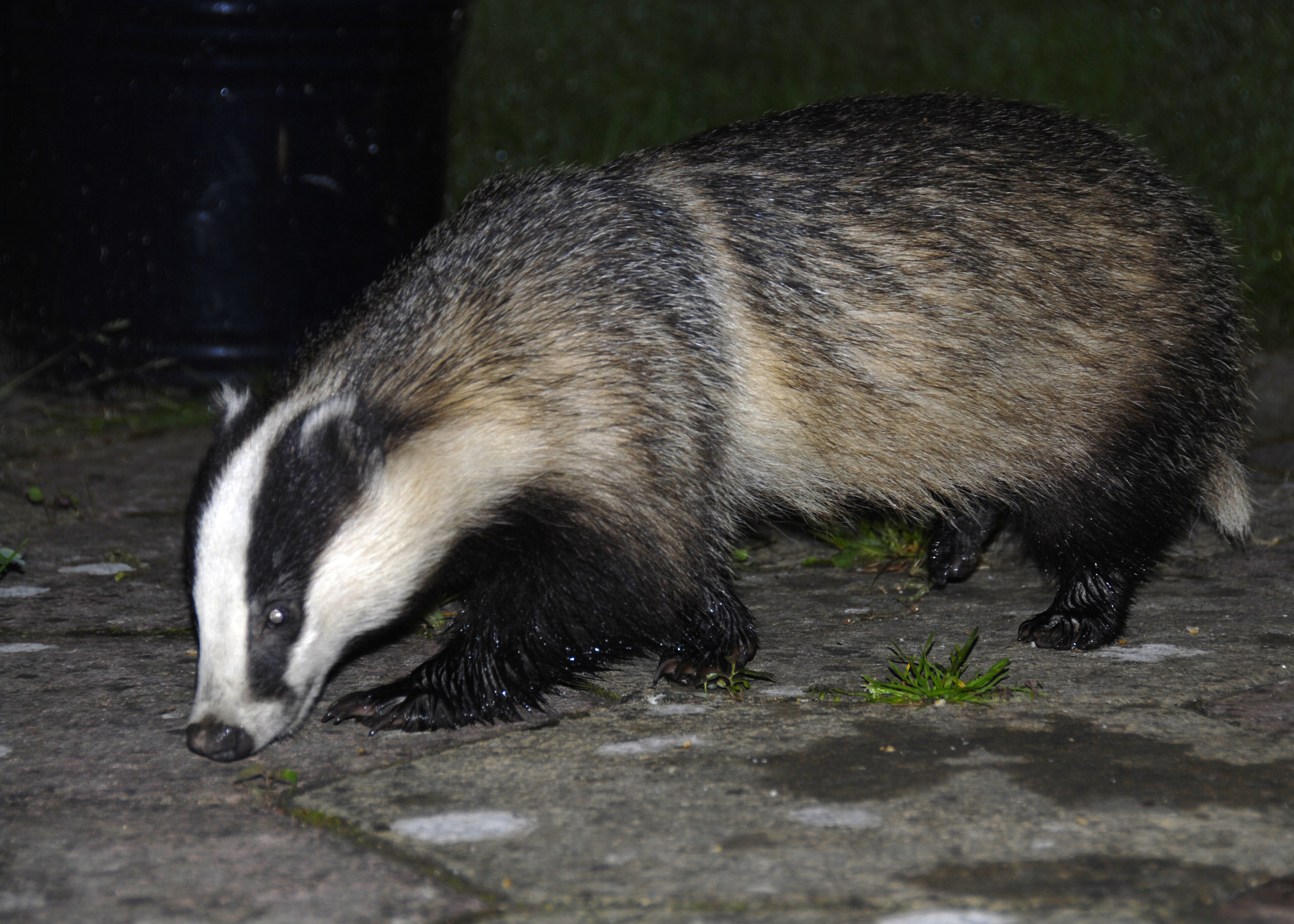
A European badger, active at night.

Many of the biological and behavioural activities of plants, animals (including birds and amphibians), insects, and microorganisms are either adversely affected by light pollution at night or can only function effectively either during or as the consequence of nightly darkness. Such activities include foraging, breeding and social behavior in higher animals, amphibians, and insects, which are all affected in various ways if light pollution occurs in their environment. These are not merely photobiological phenomena; light pollution acts by interrupting critical dark-requiring processes.

But perhaps the most important scotobiological phenomena relate to the regular periodic alternation of light and darkness. These include breeding behavior in a range of animals, the control of flowering and the induction of winter dormancy in many plants, and the operational control of the human immune system. In many of these biological processes the critical point is the length of the dark period rather than that of the light. For example, "short-day" and "long-day" plants are, in fact, "long-night" and "short-night" respectively. That is to say, plants do not measure the length of the light period, but of the dark period. One consequence of artificial light pollution is that even brief periods of relatively bright light during the night may prevent plants or animals (including humans) from measuring the length of the dark period, and therefore from behaving in a normal or required manner. This is a critical aspect of scotobiology, and one of the major areas in the study of the responses of biological systems to darkness.

In discussing scotobiology, it is important to remember that darkness (the absence of light) is seldom absolute. An important aspect of any scotobiological phenomenon is the level and quality (wavelength) of light that is below the threshold of detection for that phenomenon and in any specific organism. This important variable in scotobiological studies is not always properly noted or examined. There are substantial levels of natural light pollution at night, of which moonlight is usually the strongest. For example, plants that rely on night length to program their behaviour have the capacity to ignore full moonlight during an otherwise dark night. If this ability had not evolved, plants would not be able to respond to changing night-length for such behavioural programs as the initiation of flowering and the onset of dormancy. On the other hand, some animal behavioural patterns are strongly responsive to moonlight. It is thus most important in any scotobiological study to determine the threshold level of light that may be required to interfere with or negate the normal pattern of dark-night activity.

== Etymology ==
In 2003, at a symposium on the Ecology of the Night held in Muskoka, Canada, discussion centered around the many effects of night-time light pollution on the biology of a wide range of organisms, but it went far beyond this in describing darkness as a biological imperative for the functioning of biological systems. Presentations focused on the absolute requirement of darkness for many aspects of normal behaviour and metabolism of many organisms and for the normal progression of their life cycles. Because there was no suitable term to describe the Symposium's main focus, the term scotobiology was introduced.

The word is derived from the Greek scotos, σκότος, "dark," and relates to photobiology, which describes the biological effects of light (φῶς, phos; root: φωτ-, phot-). The term scotobiology appears not to have been used previously, although related terms such as skototropism and scotophyle have appeared in the literature.

== See also ==
- Dark-sky movement
- Dark-sky preserve
- Ecological light pollution
- Light effects on circadian rhythm
- Photoperiodism
- Sky brightness
