= Tourism in India =

Tourism in India is 4.6% of the country's gross domestic product (GDP). Unlike other sectors, tourism is not a priority sector for the Government of India. The World Travel and Tourism Council calculated that tourism generated ₹13.2 lakh crore (US$140 billion) or 5.8% of India's GDP and supported 32.1 million jobs in 2021. Even though, these numbers were lower than the pre-pandemic figures; the country's economy witnessed a significant growth in 2021 after the massive downturn during 2020. The sector is predicted to grow at an annual rate of 7.8% to ₹33.8 lakh crore (US$350 billion) by 2031 (7.2% of GDP). India has established itself as the 5th largest global travel healthcare destination with an estimated market size of around $9 billion in 2019, out of the total global travel healthcare industry of $44.8 billion (2019). In 2014, 184,298 foreign patients travelled to India to seek medical treatment.

According to the Ministry of Tourism, over 6.19 million and 1.52 million foreign tourists arrived in India in 2022 and 2021 respectively compared to 10.93 million in 2019, representing a -44% degrowth. In 2022, Gujarat Tops India in Foreign Tourism with 20.17% Share in 2022. Gujarat rose as a global tourism hotspot continues with over 15.40 lakh tourists visiting in 2023. In 2023, approximately 2509.63 million Domestic Tourist Visits (DTVs) were recorded (provisionally) compared to 1731.01 Million DTVs in 2022.

The World Economic Forum's Travel and Tourism Development Index 2021, which replaced its previous Travel and Tourism Competitiveness Report, ranks India 54th out of 117 countries overall. The last edition of the Travel and Tourism Competitiveness Report, published in 2019, had ranked India 34th out of 140 countries overall. The report ranked the price competitiveness of India's tourism sector 13th out of 140 countries. It mentioned that India has quite good air transport infrastructure (ranked 33rd), particularly given the country's stage of development, and reasonable ground and port infrastructure (ranked 28th). The country also scored high on natural resources (ranked 14th), and cultural resources and business travel (ranked 8th). The World Tourism Organization reported that India's receipts from tourism during 2012 ranked 16th in the world, and 7th among Asian and Pacific countries.

The Ministry of Tourism designs national policies for the development and promotion of tourism. In the process, the Ministry consults and collaborates with other stakeholders in the sector including various central ministries/agencies, state governments, union territories and private sector representatives. Concerted efforts are being made to promote niche tourism products such as rural, cruise, medical and eco-tourism. The Ministry of Tourism maintains the Incredible India campaign focused on promoting tourism in India.

== Visa policy of India ==
India requires citizens of most countries to hold a valid passport and apply for a travel visa at their local Indian embassy or consulate before their visit. Travellers can apply directly by mail or in person, or through their local travel services company. In 2014, India implemented an online method for citizens of 156 countries to apply for an e-Tourist Visa.

Nationals of Bhutan, Maldives, and Nepal do not require a travel visa to enter India. Citizens of Afghanistan, Argentina, Bangladesh, DPR Korea, Jamaica, Maldives, Mauritius, Mongolia, Nepal, South Africa and Uruguay are not required to pay a fee when obtaining an Indian visa.

During the pandemic year 2020, India had access to just 23 countries for travel, whereas now the Indian passport holders can travel visa-free to 60 countries.

A Protected Area Permit (PAP) is required to enter the states of Nagaland and Sikkim and some parts of the states of Arunachal Pradesh, Himachal Pradesh, Jammu and Kashmir, Manipur, Mizoram, Rajasthan and Uttarakhand. A Restricted Area Permit (RAP) is required to enter the Andaman and Nicobar Islands and parts of Sikkim. Special permits are needed to visit the Lakshadweep islands.

=== e-Tourist Visa ===
As a measure to boost tourism, the Indian Government implemented a new visa policy in November 2014, allowing tourists and business visitors to obtain a "visa on arrival" at 28 international airports, by acquiring an Electronic Travel Authorisation (ETA) online before arrival, without having to visit an Indian consulate or visa centre. In April 2015, the "visa on arrival" scheme was renamed "e-Tourist Visa" (or "e-TV") to avoid confusion.

The e-Tourist Visa facility requires a tourist to apply online on a secure Government of India website, at least four to thirty days before the date of travel. If approved, the visitor must print and carry the approved visa with their travel documents. The visa allows holders of an ETA to enter and stay anywhere in India for a period of ninety days except for citizens of US, UK, Japan and Canada. Citizens of these countries can stay for up to 180 days at a time. an ETA can be obtained twice in a single calendar year.

India first introduced its "visa on arrival" facility on 27 November 2014, soon expanding it to citizens of 74 countries. On 30 July 2015, the facility was extended to China, Macau and Hong Kong. On 15 August 2015, the facility was further extended to citizens of 36 more countries. The facility should eventually be expanded to about 180 countries.

As a result of the new visa policy, 56,477 tourists arrived on an e-Tourist Visa during October 2015, compared with 2,705 tourist arrivals during October 2014 (just before the facility was introduced), representing a 1987.9% increase.

== Statistics ==
=== Domestic tourists ===
According to the Ministry of Tourism, domestic tourism forms the predominant share of tourism in India. In 2023, approximately 2,509.63 million domestic tourist visits were recorded across Indian states and union territories, compared to 1,731.01 million visits in 2022. This figure increased to over 2,948 million visits in 2024.

=== Foreign tourist arrivals and foreign exchange earnings ===
Yearly foreign tourist arrivals in millions

Foreign tourist arrivals in India (1997–2024)
Year	Arrivals (millions)	% change
1997	2.37	3.8
1998	2.36	−0.7
1999	2.48	5.2
2000	2.65	6.7
2001	2.54	−4.2
2002	2.38	−6.0
2003	2.73	14.3
2004	3.46	26.8
2005	3.92	13.3
2006	4.45	13.5
2007	5.08	14.3
2008	5.28	4.0
2009	5.17	−2.2
2010	5.78	11.8
2011	6.31	9.2
2012	6.58	4.3
2013	6.97	5.9
2014	7.68	10.2
2015	8.03	4.5
2016	8.80	9.7
2017	10.04	14.0
2018	10.56	5.2
2019	10.93	3.5
2020	2.74	-74.9
2021	1.52	-55.4
2022	6.44	323
2023	9.51	47.6
2024	9.95	4.5

Foreign exchange earnings from tourism in India (1997–2020)
Year	Earnings (US$ million)	% change	Earnings (₹ crores)	% change
1997	2,889	2.0	10,511	4.6
1998	2,948	2.0	12,150	15.6
1999	3,009	2.1	12,951	6.6
2000	3,460	15	15,626	20.7
2001	3,198	−7.6	15,083	−3.5
2002	3,103	−3.0	15,064	−0.1
2003	4,463	43.8	20,729	37.6
2004	6,170	38.2	27,944	34.8
2005	7,493	21.4	33,123	18.5
2006	8,634	15.2	39,025	17.8
2007	10,729	24.3	44,362	13.7
2008	11,832	10.3	51,294	15.6
2009	11,136	−5.9	53,754	4.8
2010	14,193	27.5	66,172	23.1
2011	16,564	16.7	83,036	25.5
2012	17,737	7.1	95,607	15.1
2013	18,445	4.0	107,563	12.5
2014	20,236	9.7	120,367	11.9
2015	21,071	4.1	134,844	12
2016	22,923	9.1	154,146	14.3
2017	27,310	19.1	177,874	15.4
2018	28,586	4.7	194,881	9.6
2019	30,058	5.1	211,661	8.6
2020	6,958	-76.8	50,136	-76.3

Source countries for foreign tourist arrivals in India in 2024
Rank	Country	Number	Share in %
1	United States	1,804,586	18.1
2	Bangladesh	1,750,165	17.5
3	United Kingdom	1,022,587	10.2
4	Australia	518,205	5.2
5	Canada	476,273	4.7
6	Malaysia	307,526	3.0
7	Sri Lanka	281,827	2.8
8	Germany	256,348	2.5
9	France	206,855	2.0
10	Singapore	205,383	2.0
11	Nepal	202,501	2.0
12	Japan	194,875	1.9
13	Russia	160,188	1.6
14	Italy	142,239	1.4
15	Thailand	140,489	1.4
Total of top 15		7,670,047	77.0
Others		2,281,675	22.9

=== Foreign and domestic tourist visits by State ===
Share of top 10 states/UTs of India in number of foreign tourist visits in 2024
Rank	State/Union Territory	Numbers in Million	Share in %
1	Maharashtra	3.70	17.6
2	West Bengal	3.12	14.9
3	Gujarat	2.27	10.8
4	Uttar Pradesh	2.26	10.8
5	Rajasthan	2.07	9.9
6	Delhi	1.99	9.5
7	Tamil Nadu	1.16	5.5
8	Kerala	0.73	3.5
9	Bihar	0.73	3.5
10	Punjab	0.54	2.5
Total of top 10 states		18.62	88.9
Others		2.32	11.1
Total		20.94	100

Share of top 10 states/UTs of India in number of domestic tourist visits in 2022
Rank	State/Union Territory	Numbers in Million	Share in %
1	Uttar Pradesh	317.91	18.37
2	Tamil Nadu	218.58	12.63
3	Andhra Pradesh	192.72	11.13
4	Karnataka	182.41	10.54
5	Gujarat	135.81	7.85
6	Maharashtra	111.30	6.43
7	Rajasthan	108.33	6.26
8	West Bengal	84.54	4.88
9	Telangana	60.75	3.51
10	Uttarakhand	54.64	3.16
Total of top 10 states		1467.00	84.75
Others		264.01	15.25
Total		1731.01	100

== World Heritage Sites ==
There are 42 World Heritage Sites in India that are recognised by the United Nations Educational, Scientific and Cultural Organization (UNESCO) as of August 2023.

== Responsible tourism in India ==
=== Elephant camps ===
Riding elephants is a popular tourist activity in India. While the total number of elephants used for tourism in India is relatively low compared to other Asian countries (350 in India in 2017 compared to almost 2,200 in Thailand), tourists will still have opportunities to ride elephants at historic sites and watch captive elephants perform in sports and shows and religious rituals.

In early 2019, several prominent responsible tourism businesses including Responsible Travel and Intrepid Travel stopped selling tours including elephant rides citing reasons of animal cruelty and abuse. Later in 2019, The Association of British Travel Agents (ABTA) updated its animal welfare guidelines, labelling elephant riding as unacceptable.

=== Astrotourism ===
Tourism of astronomical observatories and planetariums is increasing in India as of 2025, with the Indian Astronomical Observatory in Hanle, Ladakh and other dark-sky preserves in the Himalayas, as well as sites in the Andaman Islands becoming popular destinations.

== See also ==
- Economy of India
- Aviation in India
- Fishing in India
- Tourism in India by state
- Aerial lift in India
