= Westhavelland Nature Park =

Nature park and reserve in Germany

- IUCN category V (protected landscape/seascape)
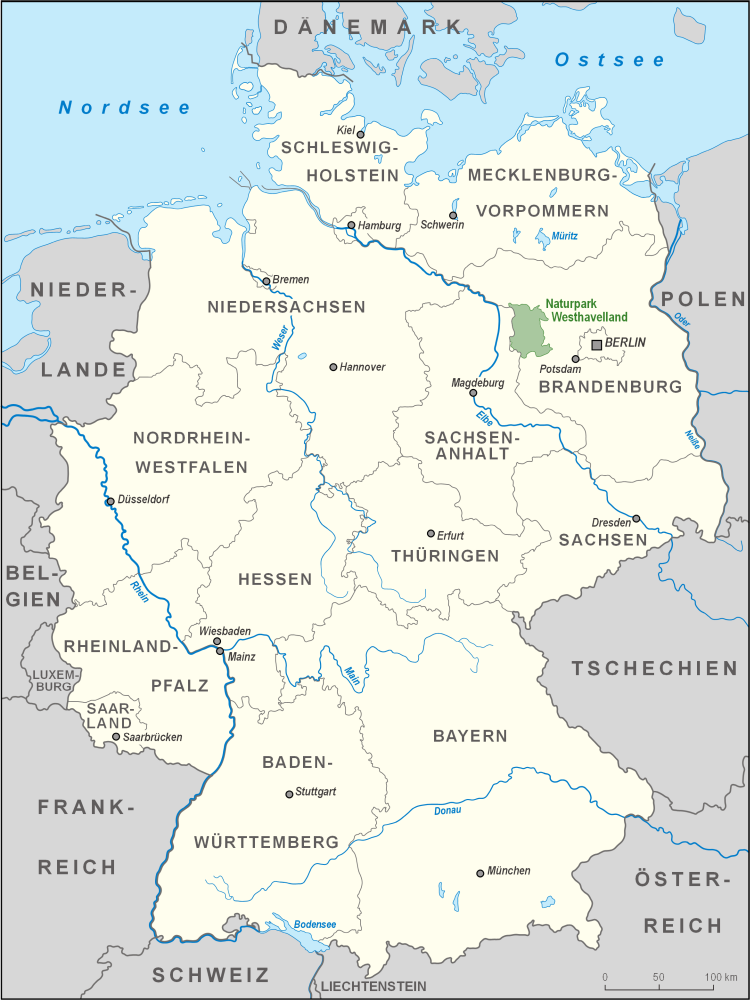
- The nature park within Germany
- Location: Brandenburg, Germany
- Coordinates: 52°40′41″N 12°15′03″E
- Area: 1,315 km^{2} (508 sq mi)
- Established: 11 June 1998

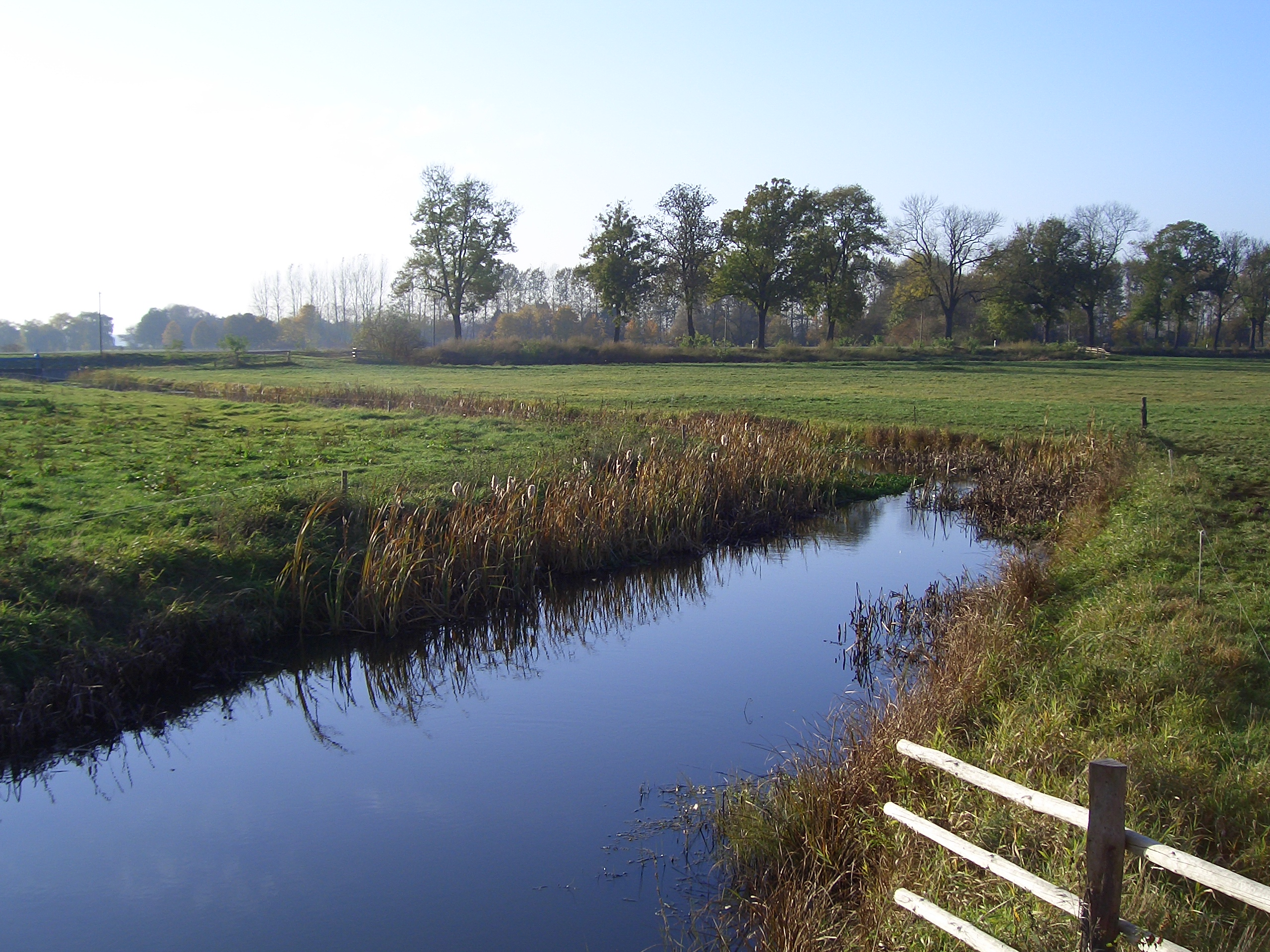

Map of the nature park

Westhavelland Nature Park is a nature park and reserve in the state of Brandenburg, Germany. It covers an area of 1,315 square kilometres (508 sq mi). It was established on 11 June 1998. The park was designated an IDA International Dark Sky Reserve on 12 February 2014.
