= Žihle =

- Municipality
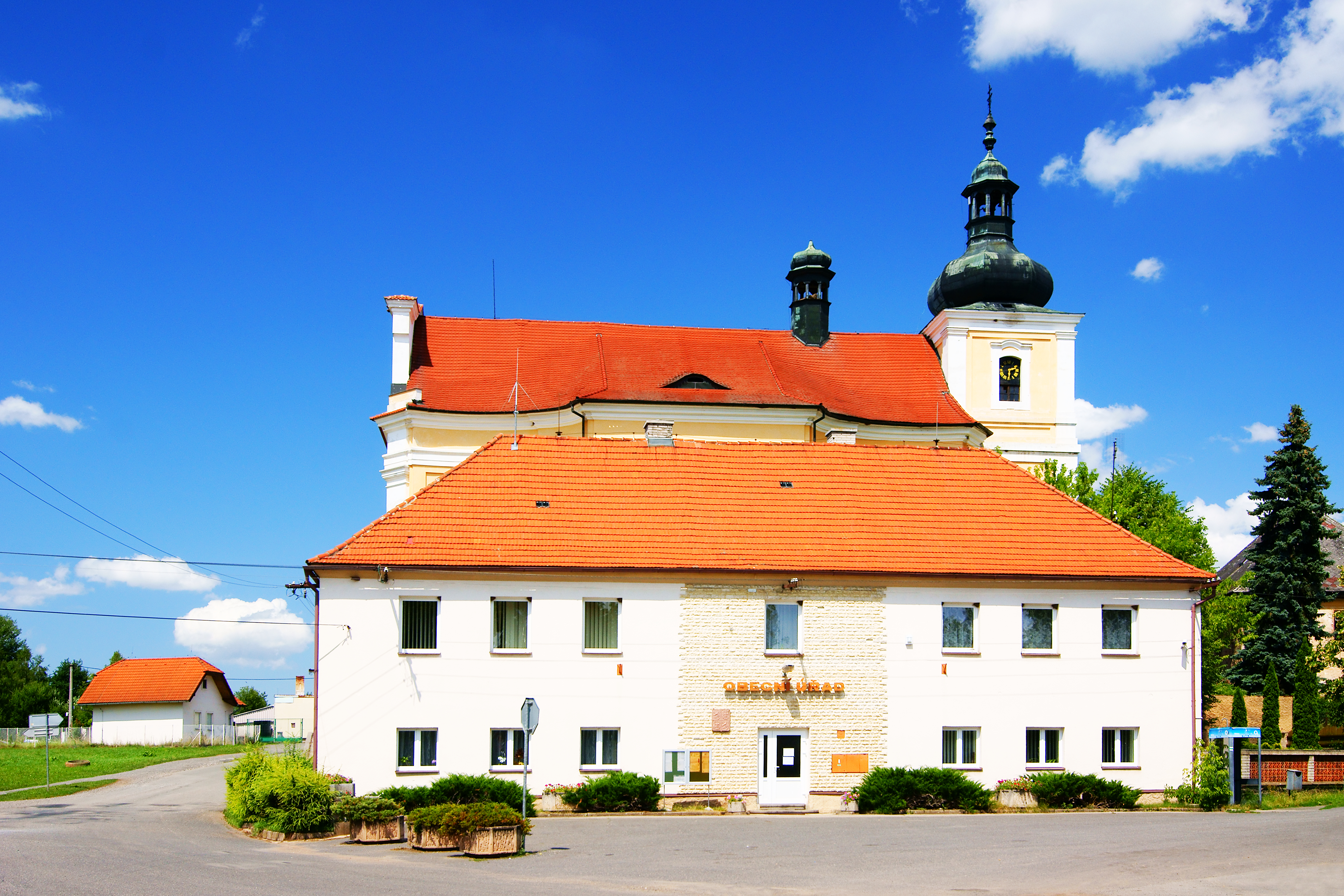
- Municipal office and the Church of Saint Wenceslaus

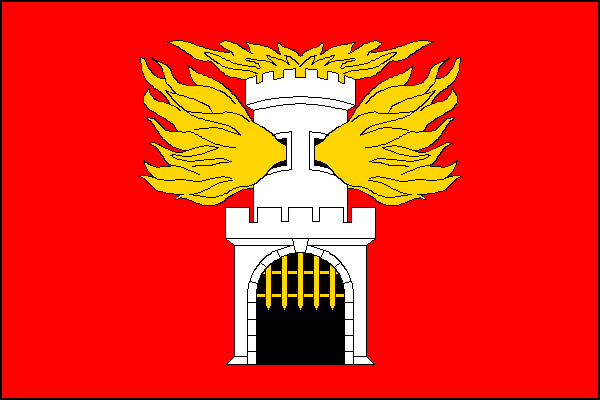
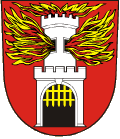
- Flag Coat of arms

- Location in the Czech Republic
- Coordinates: 50°2′40″N 13°22′18″E
- Country: Czech Republic
- Region: Plzeň
- District: Plzeň-North
- First mentioned: 1238

Area
  - Total: 39.84 km^{2} (15.38 sq mi)
- Elevation: 448 m (1,470 ft)

Population (2026-01-01)
  - Total: 1,275
  - Density: 32.00/km^{2} (82.89/sq mi)
- Time zone: UTC+1 (CET)
  - Summer (DST): UTC+2 (CEST)
- Postal code: 331 65
- Website: www.obec-zihle.cz

Žihle (German: Scheles) is a municipality and village in Plzeň-North District in the Plzeň Region of the Czech Republic. It has about 1,300 inhabitants.

Žihle lies approximately 33 kilometres (21 mi) north of Plzeň and 76 km (47 mi) west of Prague.

== Administrative division ==
Žihle consists of six municipal parts (in brackets population according to the 2021 census):

- Žihle (1,049)
- Hluboká (26)
- Kalec (0)
- Nový Dvůr (20)
- Odlezly (54)
- Přehořov (55)

== Demographics ==
Historical population
| Year | Pop. | ±% |
|---|---|---|
| 1869 | 1,450 | — |
| 1880 | 1,535 | +5.9% |
| 1890 | 1,482 | −3.5% |
| 1900 | 1,449 | −2.2% |
| 1910 | 1,527 | +5.4% |
| 1921 | 1,682 | +10.2% |
| 1930 | 1,882 | +11.9% |
| 1950 | 1,320 | −29.9% |
| 1961 | 1,307 | −1.0% |
| 1970 | 1,245 | −4.7% |
| 1980 | 1,279 | +2.7% |
| 1991 | 1,416 | +10.7% |
| 2001 | 1,419 | +0.2% |
| 2011 | 1,403 | −1.1% |
| 2021 | 1,204 | −14.2% |
Source: Censuses
