= Zselic National Landscape Protection Area =

Dark-sky preserve in Hungary

- Zselici Tájvédelmi Körzet
- Interactive map of Zselic National Landscape Protection Area
- Nearest city: Kaposvár
- Coordinates: 46°13′42″N 17°45′28″E
- Area: 8,337 hectares (32.19 mi^{2})
- Established: 1976
- Administrator: Danube-Drava National Park

Zselic National Landscape Protection Area (Hungarian language: Zselici Tájvédelmi Körzet [ˈʒɛlitsi ˈtaːjveːdɛlmi ˈkøɾzɛt]) is a dark-sky preserve in Hungary. It is located in the counties of Somogy and Baranya, between Kaposvár and Pécs. The boundary of the protection area is managed by the Danube-Drava National Park. This includes some of the hills of Transdanubia, in the heart of the massif of Zselic.
