= Manětín Dark-Sky Park =

Dark-sky preserve in the Czech Republic

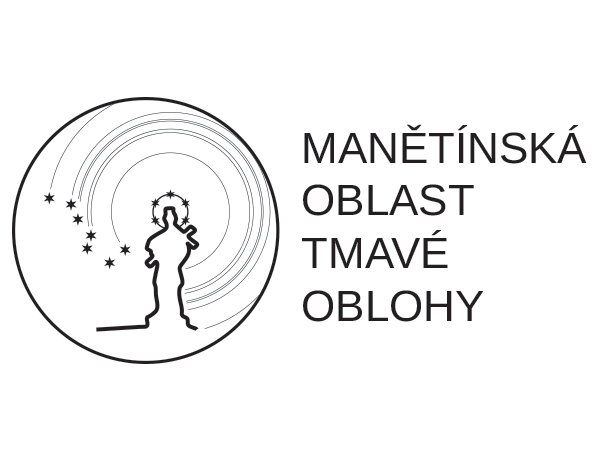
- Interactive map of Manětín Dark-Sky Park
- Nearest city: Manětín
- Area: 346 km^{2} (134 sq mi)
- Established: 15 September 2014
- Website: manetinskatma.cz

The Manětín Dark-Sky Park (Czech: Manětínská oblast tmavé oblohy – MOTO) is a dark-sky preserve in the Plzeň and Karlovy Vary regions, Czech Republic. It includes 10 municipalities (Manětín, Bezvěrov, Dražeň, Hvozd, Krsy, Nečtiny, Pšov, Štědrá, Štichovice, and partially Toužim). Its area (346 km^{2}) covers 0.4% of the territory of the Czech Republic. The park was established in 2014 with the primary goal of informing the public about the issue of light pollution, as well as protecting nature and the environment. It is the first Czech dark-sky preserve located exclusively on the country's territory, as well as outside other types of protected areas. It is supported by the Czech Astronomical Society.
