= Josef Antonín Plánický =

Czech composer and musician

Josef Antonín Plánický (27 November 1691 – 17 September 1732) was a Czech composer, musician and singer of the Baroque era.

== Life ==
Born in Manětín, Plánický received basic musical education from his father, who was the teacher and organist in the church of his hometown, and thereafter probably studied at some Jesuit schools. In 1715, he became a music teacher in the family of Count Lažanský and later worked in the service of aristocratic families at several locations in Bohemia, Moravia and Austria, until his death in Freising in 1732.

== Works ==
His most famous work, and the only one to be fully preserved, is Opella ecclesiastica seu Ariae duodecim nova idea excornatae, a collection of 12 spiritual cantatas from 1723. The collection contains seven soprano, three alto and two bass vocal arias, which are accompanied by organ or harpsichord, two violins, violon, and solo oboe or solo violin. In 1724, he wrote an opera Zelus divi Corbinian Ecclesiae Frisigensis Fundamentum. It is also known that he composed numerous litanies, motets, Te Deums and requiems, as well as some special compositions called musica navalis (Naval Music) for rides on Prague's Vltava River. However, none of these survived, because the archive was dismantled.

== Sources ==
- Československý hudební slovník ('Czechoslovak musical dictionary'), 1965, Prague
