= Valle de Oro National Wildlife Refuge =

Wildlife refuge in New Mexico, United States

- IUCN category IV (habitat/species management area)
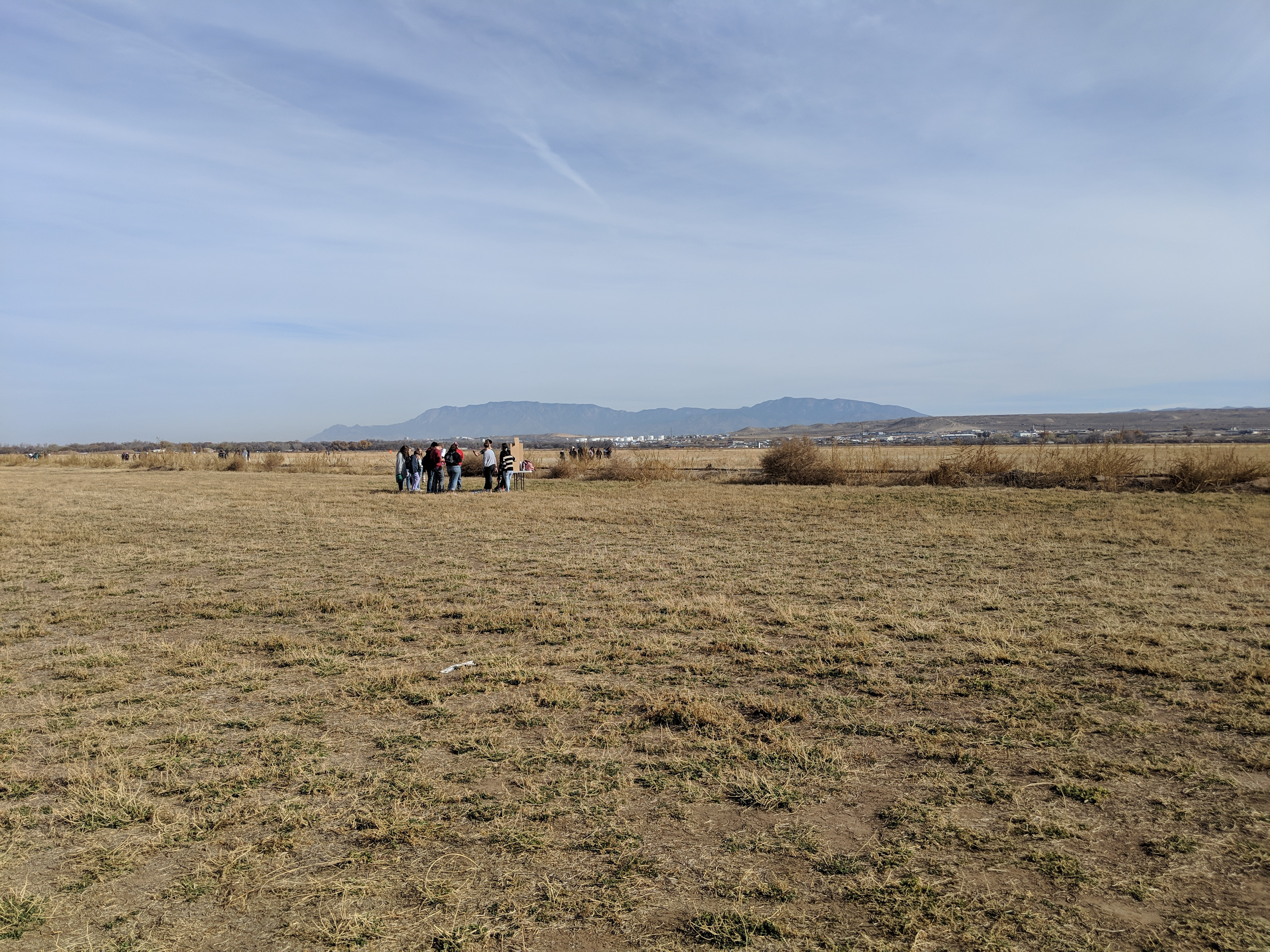

- Location within the United States
- Location: Bernalillo County, New Mexico, United States
- Nearest city: Albuquerque, New Mexico
- Coordinates: 34.97°N 106.67°W
- Area: 570 acres (230 ha)
- Established: 2012
- Governing body: U.S. Fish & Wildlife Service
- Website: Valle de Oro National Wildlife Refuge

The Valle de Oro National Wildlife Refuge is a protected area in New Mexico managed by the United States Fish and Wildlife Service as part of the National Wildlife Refuge System. It is located 7 miles (11 km) south of Albuquerque, New Mexico. This unit abuts the Rio Grande Valley State Park, which is adjacent to the Rio Grande.

== History ==
The land that is presently Valle de Oro National Wildlife Refuge was operated for decades as a dairy farm. After the closure of this facility, this area was dominated by alfalfa and fescue fields, it became seen as a potential development site for suburban homes until its purchase by the Trust for Public Land was negotiated. In 2011, the site was earmarked for federal improvements, and in 2012 it was transferred to the U.S. Fish & Wildlife Service.

The site's restoration into native Middle Rio Grande Valley habitats for resident and migratory wildlife is ongoing. Federal administrators plan to extend the bosque (riparian forest of the Rio Grande) onto the refuge. In 2015, the refuge's land acquisition was finalized, bringing the size of the National Wildlife Refuge to 570.03 acres (230.68 ha).

Valle de Oro NWR is designated as an Urban National Wildlife Refuge, due to its proximity to Albuquerque. It is the U.S. Fish & Wildlife Service's first Urban NWR in its Southwest region to be built from the ground up under the new Urban Wildlife Conservation Program's Standards of Excellence.

In 2022, a new visitors center was opened to the public with contributions from the local community, community consultants, the Pueblo of Isleta, NM Commission for the Blind, community partner organizations, individuals with a personal connection to the refuge and the Friends of Valle de Oro. The center features several exhibits designed by local interactive experience company, Ideum, such as a community gathering space, a custom mural, and educational interactives for all ages. The center is focused on accessibility and community.
