= Manětín =

- Town
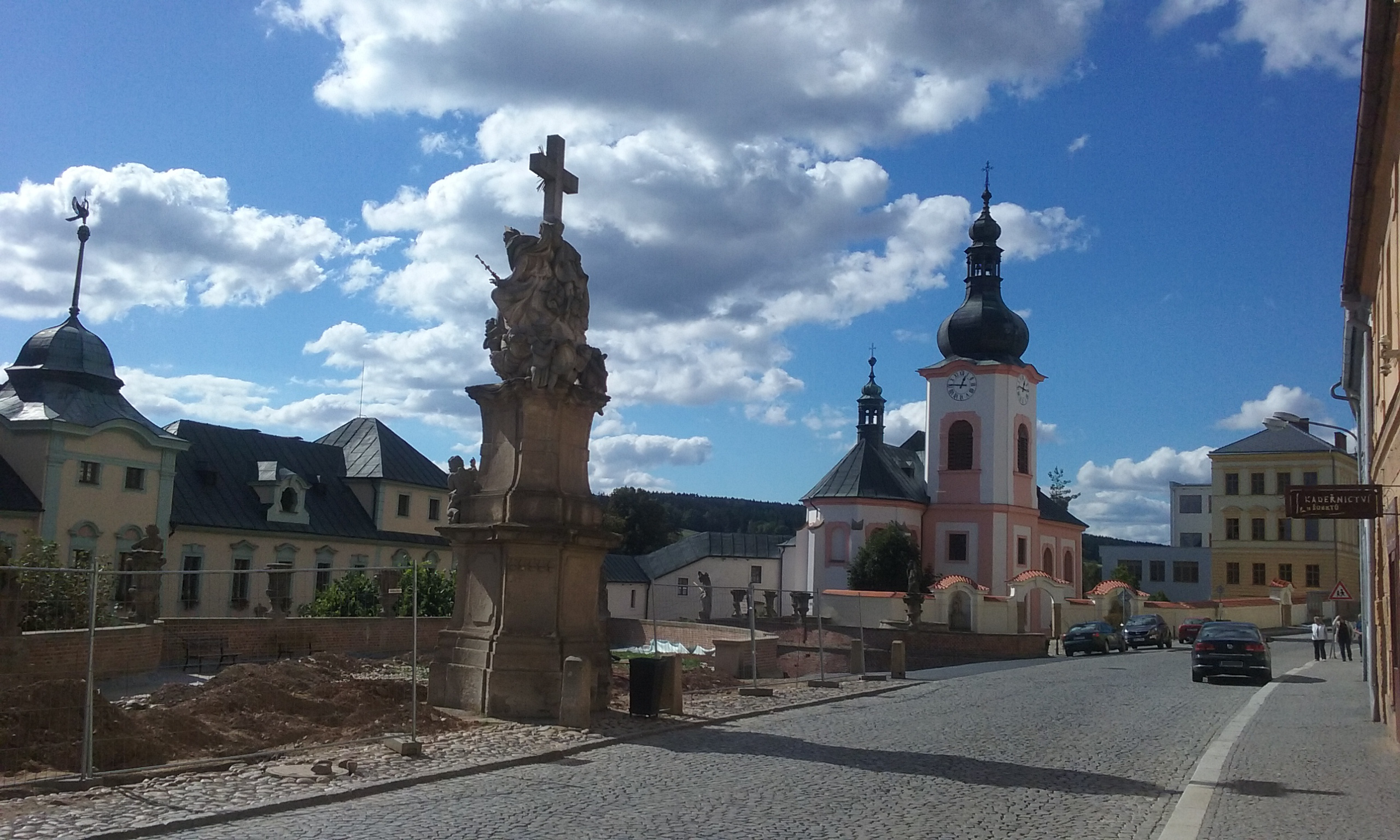
- Town square with the Church of Saint John the Baptist

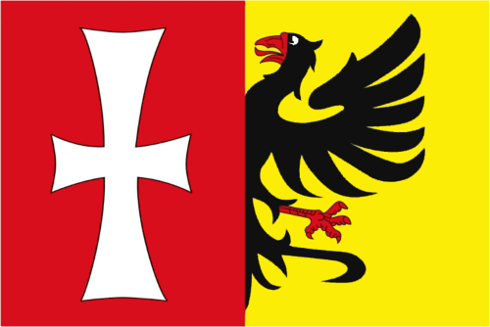
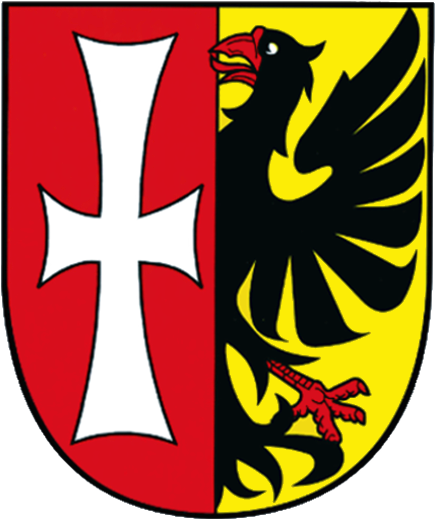
- Flag Coat of arms

- Location in the Czech Republic
- Coordinates: 49°59′31″N 13°13′59″E
- Country: Czech Republic
- Region: Plzeň
- District: Plzeň-North
- First mentioned: 1169

Government
  - Mayor: Kamil Hanus

Area
  - Total: 84.64 km^{2} (32.68 sq mi)
- Elevation: 413 m (1,355 ft)

Population (2026-01-01)
  - Total: 1,143
  - Density: 13.50/km^{2} (34.98/sq mi)
- Time zone: UTC+1 (CET)
  - Summer (DST): UTC+2 (CEST)
- Postal code: 331 62
- Website: www.manetin.cz

Manětín (Czech pronunciation: [ˈmaɲɛciːn]; German: Manetin) is a town in Plzeň-North District in the Plzeň Region of the Czech Republic. It has about 1,100 inhabitants. The historic town centre and the centre of Rabštejn nad Střelou are well preserved and both are protected as two urban monument zones.

== Administrative division ==
Manětín consists of 15 municipal parts (in brackets population according to the 2021 census):

- Manětín (719)
- Brdo (18)
- Česká Doubravice (10)
- Hrádek (16)
- Kotaneč (5)
- Lipí (11)
- Luková (7)
- Mezí (49)
- Rabštejn nad Střelou (25)
- Radějov (0)
- Stvolny (95)
- Újezd (32)
- Vladměřice (52)
- Vysočany (16)
- Zhořec (51)

== Etymology ==
The name is derived from the personal name Maňata, meaning "Maňata's (court, stream)".

== Geography ==
Manětín is located about 27 kilometres (17 mi) north of Plzeň. It lies in the Rakovník Uplands. The highest point is the hill Velká Mýť at 658 m (2,159 ft) above sea level. The stream Manětínský potok flows through the town. The Střela River crosses the territory in the northeast and continues along the eastern border.

== History ==
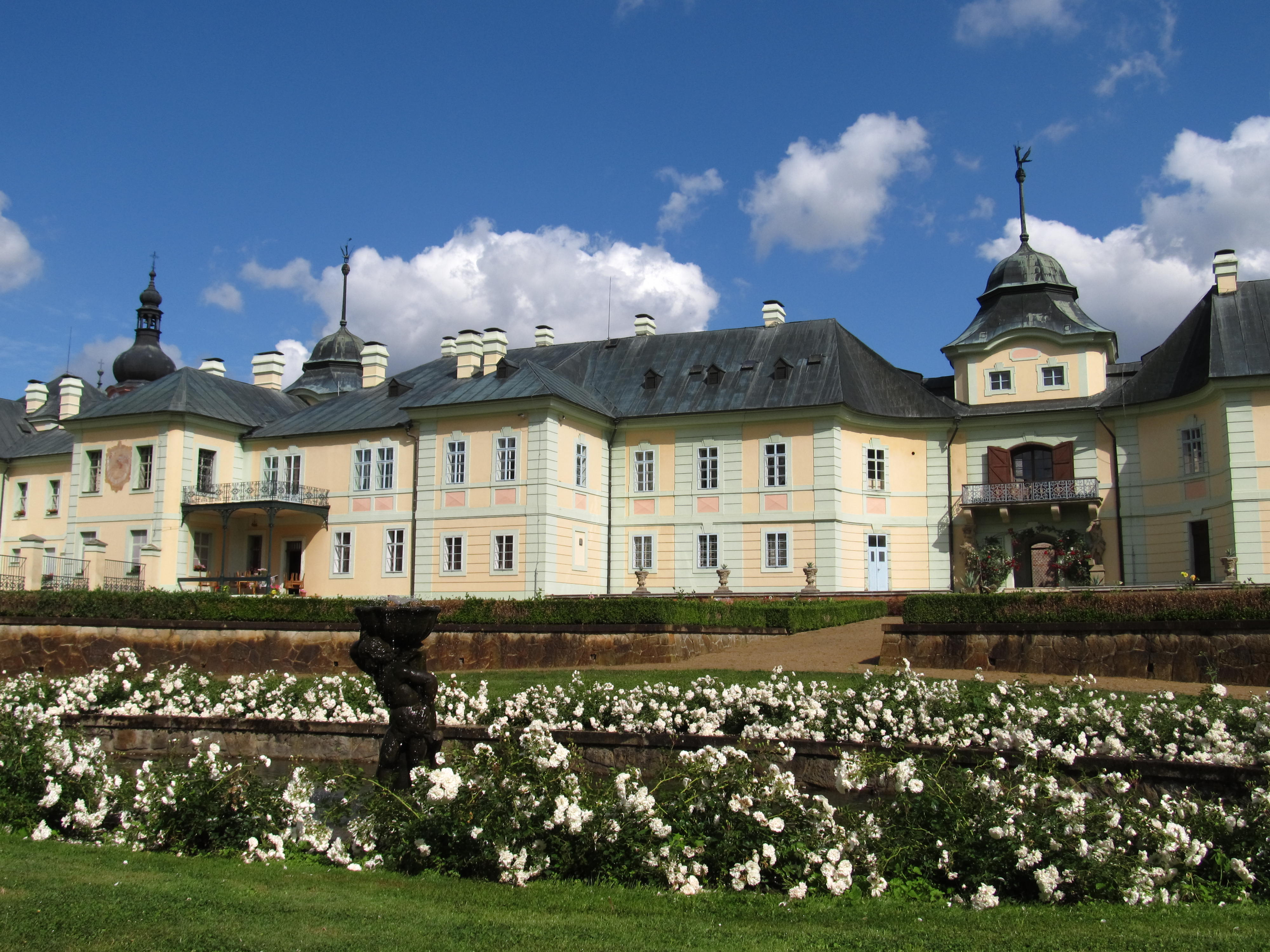
Manětín Castle

The first written mention of Manětín is from 1169, when King Vladislaus II donated the settlement to the order of Knights Hospitaller. The order had built here a commandery, town walls, and a fortress with a monastery. They owned Manětín until 1420, when King Sigismund gave the town to Bohuslav of Švamberk. From a legal point of view, the town belonged to the Knights Hospitaller until 1483, when the Švamberks paid them off.

In 1544, the Švamberk family sold Manětín to Volf the Younger Krajíř of Krajek. In 1548, it was acquired by the Schlick family. They replaced the old fortress with a Renaissance castle and greatly expanded the estate. They had to sell the estate in 1617 because of debts. During the Thirty Years' War, internal disputes took place in the town and owners changed rapidly. In 1639, Manětín was inherited by the Lažanský family, who held it until 1945.

In 1712, a huge fire destroyed half of the town with the castle, church and school. Immediately after the fire, Václav Josef Lažanský had completely rebuilt the castle according to the plans by Jan Santini Aichel.

== Demographics ==
Historical population

Year	Pop.	±%
1869	3,624	—
1880	3,701	+2.1%
1890	3,672	−0.8%
1900	3,424	−6.8%
1910	3,341	−2.4%

Year	Pop.	±%
1921	3,289	−1.6%
1930	3,104	−5.6%
1950	1,753	−43.5%
1961	1,767	+0.8%
1970	1,542	−12.7%

Year	Pop.	±%
1980	1,476	−4.3%
1991	1,350	−8.5%
2001	1,245	−7.8%
2011	1,154	−7.3%
2021	1,106	−4.2%

Source: Censuses

== Transport ==
There are no railways or major roads passing through the municipality.

== Sights ==
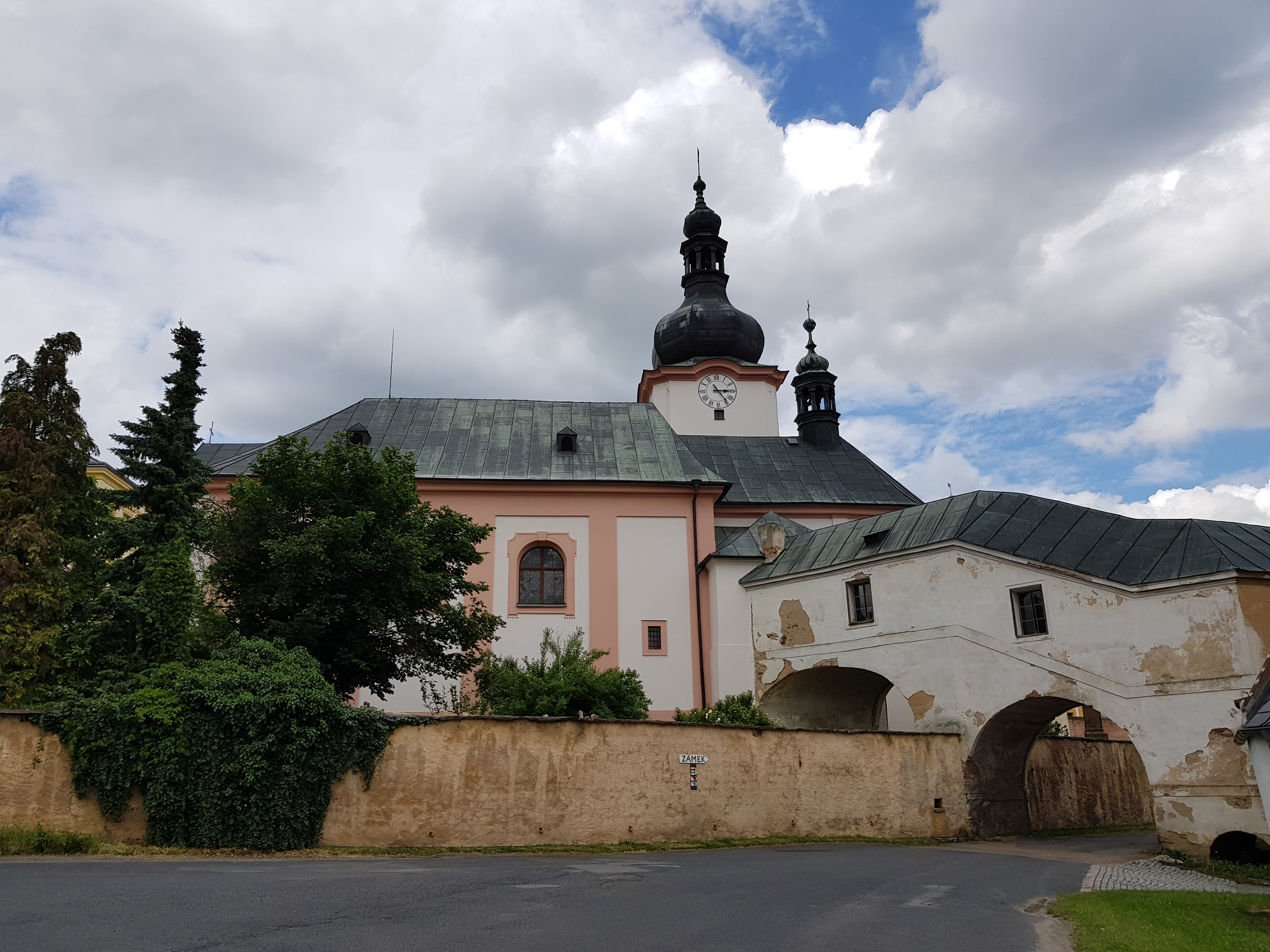
Church of Saint John the Baptist and the corridor

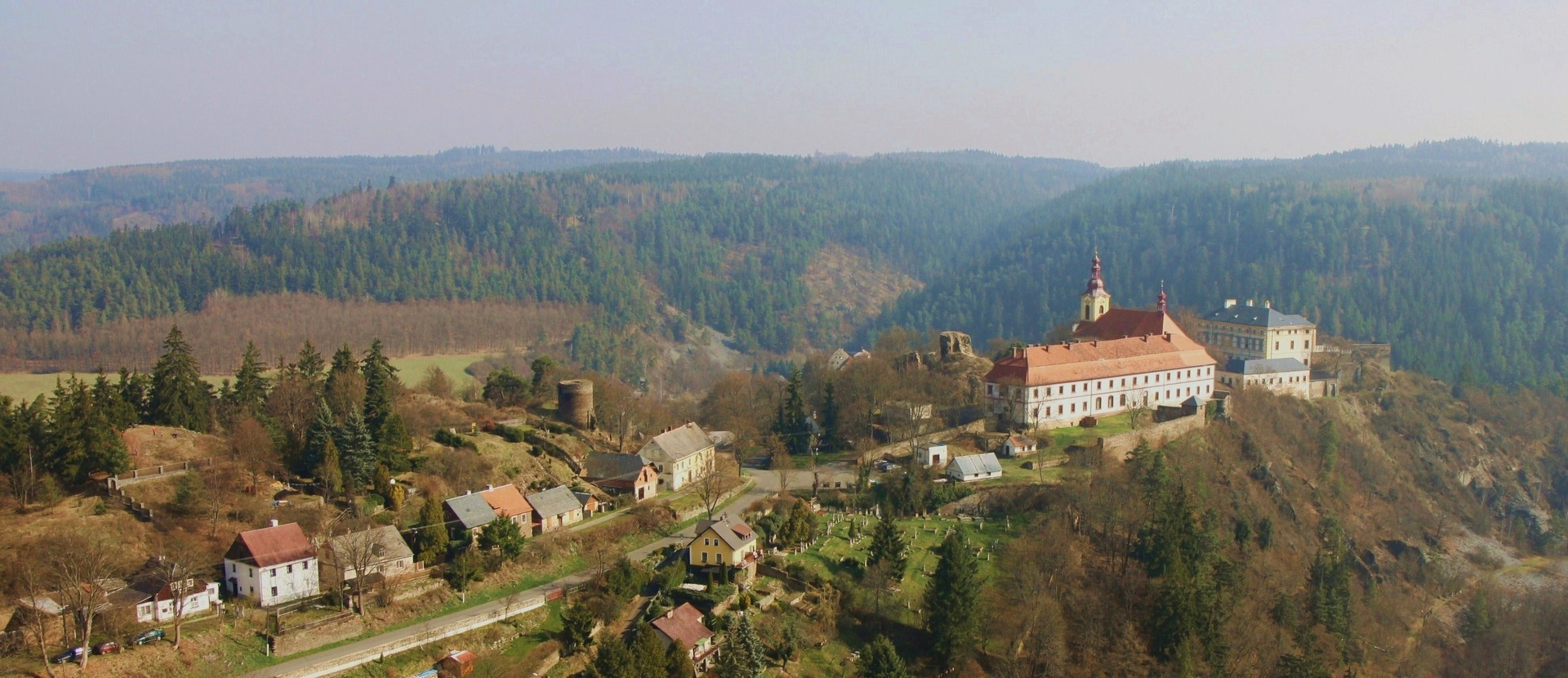
Aerial view of Rabštejn nad Střelou

The most important building is the Manětín Castle. The Baroque building dates from 1712 and since 1945, it is owned by the state. Today the castle is open to the public and offers sightseeing tours. Adjacent to the castle is a Baroque garden and an English park.

Next to the castle is the Church of Saint John the Baptist. The church is connected to the castle by a corridor. The original church dates from the 12th century. It was rebuilt in the 14th century and then after the fire in 1712–1717. The valuable church complex includes the rectory, the enclosure wall with two gates, and statues and crosses.

Although Rabštejn nad Střelou is not an independent municipality and is a municipal part of Manětín, it is often referred to as a town due to its history and urban character, and is referred to as the smallest town in Europe with about 20 inhabitants. In a small area, there are many monuments: the ruins of the Sychrov Castle from the 14th century, the Baroque castle from 1705, the town fortifications from the first half of the 13th century, the Servite monastery from 1672 with the adjacent Church of Our Lady of Seven Sorrows, a group of timbered and half-timbered houses as examples of the local vernacular architecture, and a stone bridge.

== Notable people ==
- Josef Antonín Plánický (1691–1732), composer

== See also ==
- Manětín Dark-Sky Park, a dark-sky preserve
