= Astrotourism =

Travel for astronomy-related purposes

Astrotourism is travel to view the night sky and experience celestial events such as eclipses. A closely related concept is dark sky tourism, which involves travel to places with little light pollution. The practice gained popularity following the 2024 total solar eclipse over North America.

== History ==
The concept of travelling to view celestial events extends back to early astronomical observations. Ancient civilizations constructed astronomical monuments that attracted visitors, with sites like Stonehenge serving both ceremonial and astronomical purposes that continue to draw tourists.

However, astrotourism's modern development began in the 20th century. In 1988, the International Dark-Sky Association (IDA) was founded in Tucson, Arizona. The nonprofit went on to play a key role in formalizing astrotourism by establishing the International Dark Sky Places Program in 2001.

The 21st century saw growth in astrotourism infrastructure and recognition across the world, with a Welsh island achieving Dark Sky certification in 2023, and Saudi Arabia opening the Middle East's first Dark Sky Parks in 2024. The COVID-19 pandemic contributed to increased interest in the activity, which can be done by those practicing social distancing.

== Dark Sky Places ==
According to DarkSky International in 2024 over 220 sites have been designated as International Dark Sky Places. As of 2025 Utah had the highest concentration of such places in the world.

In March 2026, Putscheid in northern Luxembourg was designated as the country's first International Dark Sky Community. Known as Stärepark Pëtschent, the 27-square-kilometre area uses lighting controls, continuous sky-brightness monitoring and public astronomy activities to support dark-sky preservation and astrotourism.

== Sectors ==
Northern lights tourism is one of the more popular sectors, accounting for US$834.5 million in 2023. Eclipse tourism interest increased after the 2017 and 2024 solar eclipses, with interest increasing in travelling to view the 2026 solar eclipse in Iceland and 2027 solar eclipse in Egypt. Tourism of astronomical observatories and planetariums is also increasing in India as of 2023.

== Sustainability and ethical concerns ==
As astrotourism, and in particular dark sky tourism, gained popularity, academics and advocates of dark sky preserves have expressed concern that such tourism may threaten an area's capability of avoiding increased light pollution.

Moab, Utah, created ordinances to reduce light pollution as dark sky tourism increased in the area.

== Notable initiatives and digital platforms ==
Astronomitaly is an Italian dark-sky and astrotourism initiative founded in 2013. The project promotes night-sky preservation, sustainable tourism, and astronomical education through its national certification program I Cieli più Belli d’Italia (“The Most Beautiful Skies of Italy”), which identifies destinations with high sky quality and low light pollution.

Academic studies describe Astronomitaly as a significant international case study in the development of astrotourism and digital promotion of dark-sky areas, highlighting its role in connecting environmental protection, astronomy outreach, and tourism innovation.

Astrotourism.com is the digital platform associated with the initiative. It serves as an online hub for identifying dark-sky locations, certified observation sites, and astronomical experiences. Research highlights the platform as one of the early structured attempts to organize and promote astrotourism offerings at a national and international scale.

Both Astronomitaly and Astrotourism.com have received coverage from major Italian media outlets—including RAI, SkyTG24, Vougue Italia, la Repubblica and Il Sole 24 Ore—for their contribution to public awareness of light pollution and dark-sky preservation.
