= Irving Nature Park =

Free park in Saint John, New Brunswick, Canada

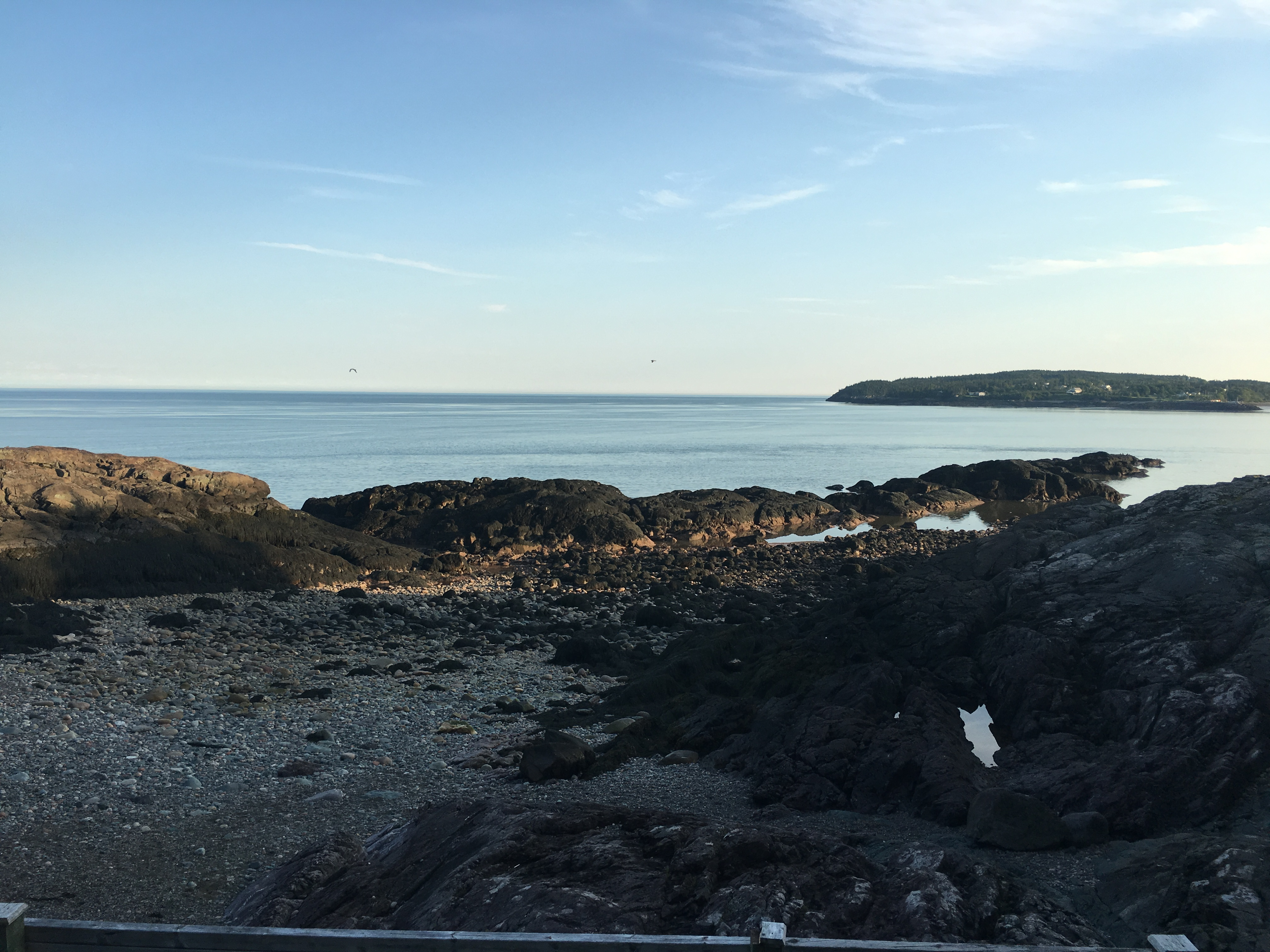
- Interactive map of Irving Nature Park
- Type: Urban park
- Location: Saint John, New Brunswick
- Coordinates: 45.22316°N 66.128426°W
- Area: 600 acres (240 ha)
- Created: 1992
- Operator: J.D. Irving

The Irving Nature Park is a park on the outskirts of the city of Saint John, New Brunswick, Canada, open to the public with the intention of protecting the environment. It encompasses a total of 243 hectares (600 acres) and is sandwiched between a salt marsh and the Bay of Fundy.

The park is owned and operated by JD Irving and is open annually from May through October for motor-vehicle traffic.

In 2011, Irving Nature Park became the first park to be designated as an Urban Star Park by the Royal Astronomical Society of Canada.
