= Lost Trail National Wildlife Refuge =

Protected area in Montana, United States

- IUCN category IV (habitat/species management area)
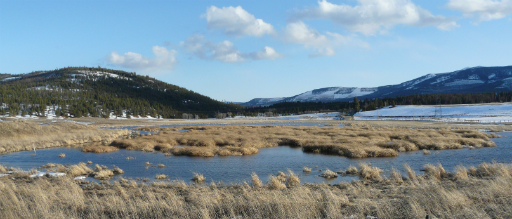

- Location within Montana Location within the United States
- Location: Flathead County, Montana, United States
- Nearest city: Kalispell, MT
- Coordinates: 48°10′03″N 114°49′45″W
- Area: 8,834 acres (35.75 km^{2})
- Established: August 24, 1999
- Governing body: U.S. Fish and Wildlife Service
- Website: Lost Trail National Wildlife Refuge

Lost Trail National Wildlife Refuge is a 8,834-acre (3,575 ha) National Wildlife Refuge of the United States located in Montana. Established in 1999, it is one of the newest National Wildlife Refuges in the U.S. and is managed by the U.S. Fish and Wildlife Service, an agency of the U.S. Department of the Interior. The refuge was originally a sprawling horse and cattle ranch dating back to the late 19th century and was known as the Lost Trail Ranch. The refuge consists of prairie and wetlands, and has a wide diversity of plant and animal species, including over 100 species of birds such as canada geese, sandhill crane, wood duck, green-winged teals and herons. Several species of grouse also inhabit the refuge. Predatory bird species such as the great horned owl and red-tailed hawk are also found here.

Both the threatened grizzly bear and the endangered gray wolf live in the region, but mammals most commonly found include white-tailed deer, mule deer, elk, moose and the black bear. The less common wolverine, badger, lynx, bobcat and marten have been recorded on the refuges known species list.

The refuge is located about 40 mi (64 km) west of Kalispell, Montana, following U.S. Highway 2. It is not permanently staffed and has few improvements. As a part of the Western Montana National Wildlife Refuge Complex, this refuge is managed by the Northwest Montana Wetland Management District.
