= Noctourism =

Touristic experiences after dark

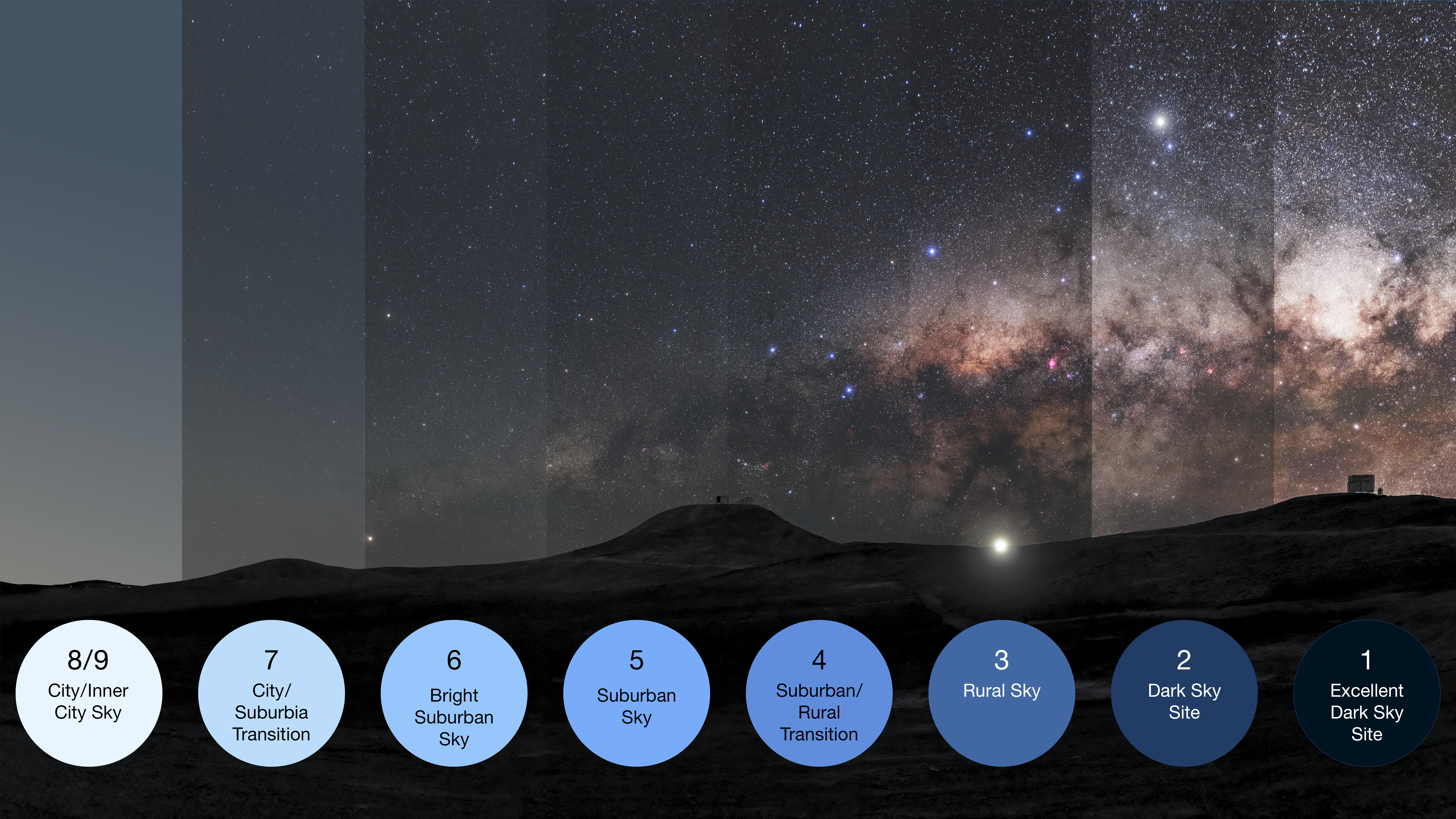
Locations with varying levels of light pollution for observing the night sky

Noctourism (from nocturnal and tourism) is a type of tourism that offers travel experiences after sunset: nighttime adventures, excursions and exploration of locations after dark — from lantern festivals and northern lights watching to nighttime city walks, sleeping under the stars, and encounters with wildlife. The term noctourism has gradually become established in English-language dictionaries to denote tourist services offered during nighttime hours. Travel companies and online booking systems such as Booking.com have reported a surge in search queries and bookings for nighttime experiences and have described noctourism as one of the biggest travel trends of 2025.

== Development of the industry ==
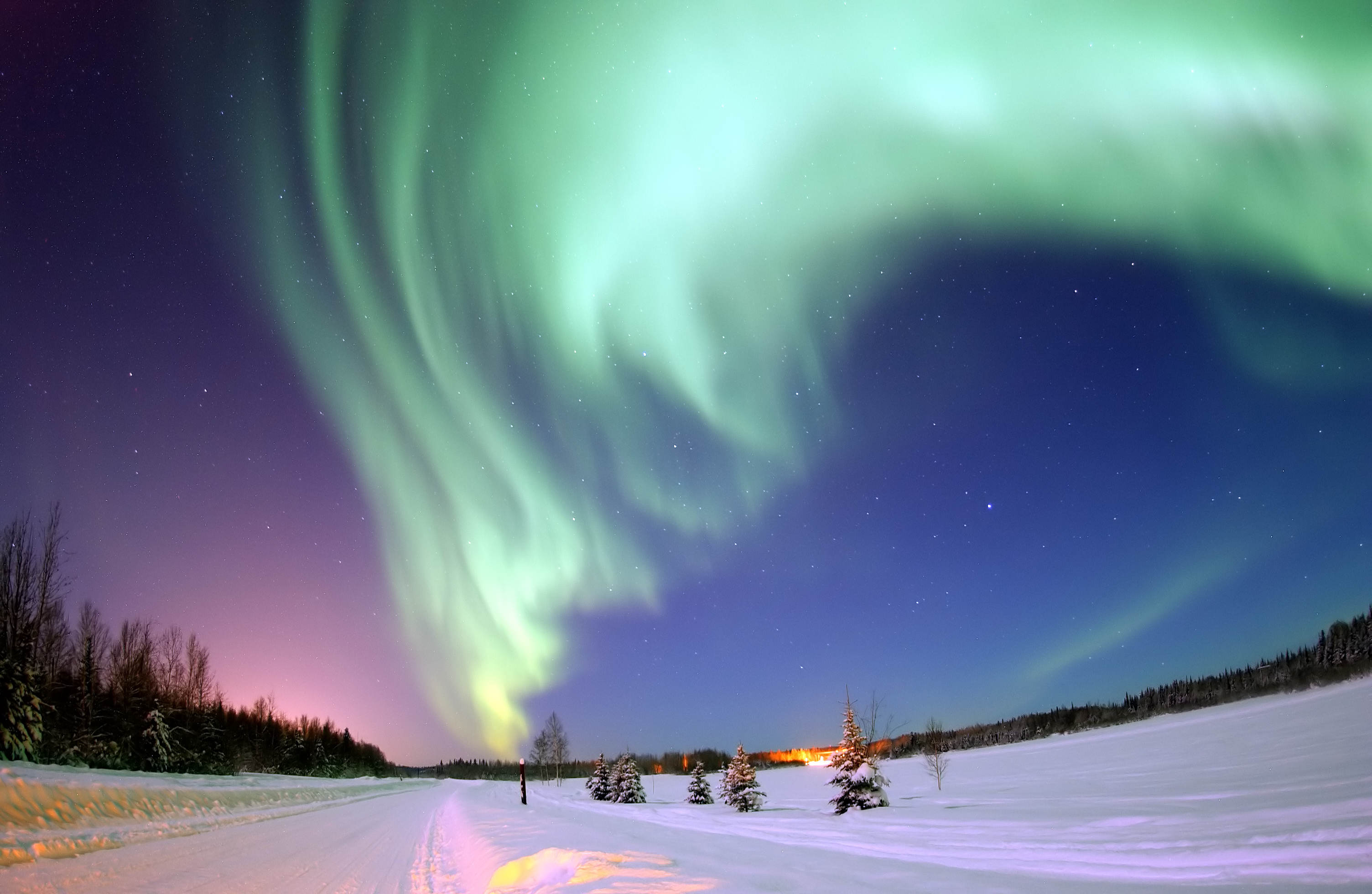
Aurora borealis over Bear Lake in Alaska

In 2024–2025, interest in nighttime recreation (from stargazing to night tours and night safaris) increased noticeably, as noted by travel publications. This trend is partly linked to growing demand for destinations with low levels of light pollution suitable for night-sky observation, as well as to a rising interest in unique and emotional travel experiences. On the one hand, the spread of noctourism creates new opportunities for regional economic development; on the other, it raises questions of safety, logistics, and environmental impact — particularly regarding light pollution and the effects of nighttime activity on wildlife.

Noctourism represents a rapidly expanding niche within the travel industry that requires institutional regulation and safety standards for night programs (such as certification of "Dark Sky" locations, rules for night safaris, and lighting criteria in historic centers).

== Types of noctourism ==
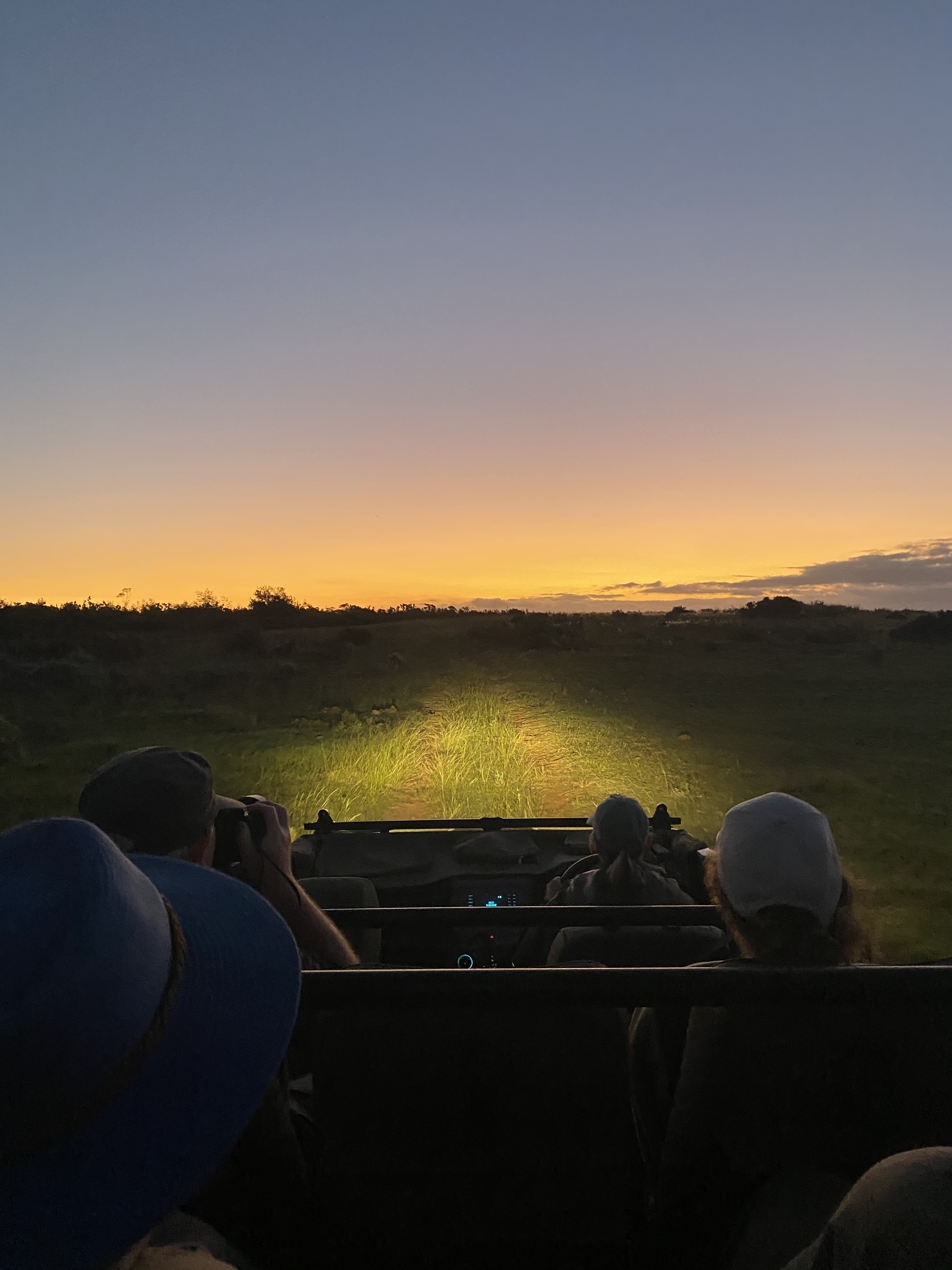
Night safari in South Africa

Noctourism encompasses a wide range of activities and formats that take place after sunset and during nighttime hours. Many of these overlap or combine into hybrid programs.

=== Stargazing ===
Observation of the starry sky, the Milky Way, meteor showers, and other astronomical phenomena in areas with low levels of light pollution (“dark-sky places”). Such trips often include lectures by astronomers, the use of telescopes, and special nighttime camping under the open sky.

=== Northern lights ===
Aurora viewing in Iceland

Searching for and observing the northern lights is an example of niche noctourism that requires seasonal planning, awareness of auroral forecasts, and often specialized logistics (transportation, accommodation in remote areas, and guides). Such tours may include multiple viewing attempts.

=== Night city tours ===
Walking and bus tours through evening and nighttime urban locations: illuminated architecture, night markets, gastronomic routes, night museums, or extended-hour exhibitions. This format combines cultural, gastronomic, and entertainment elements and is often tailored to a city's local character.

=== Night diving ===
Underwater diving at night using lights to observe organisms active only in darkness (for example, certain species of fish, corals, and plankton). Night diving requires additional equipment and specific safety training.

=== Night safaris ===
Safari conducted after dark, when many species—such as nocturnal predators and mammals—are most active. This format includes designated routes, nighttime observation towers, and strict safety protocols to protect both people and wildlife.

== Sources ==
- Vermillion, Stephanie (2024). 100 Nights of a Lifetime: The World’s Ultimate Adventures After Dark. National Geographic.
