= Commission for Dark Skies =

UK campaign group

Commission for Dark Skies logo

The Commission for Dark Skies (CfDS) (formerly the Campaign for Dark Skies; the name was changed on March 29, 2015) is the United Kingdom's largest anti-light-pollution campaign group forming part of the international dark-sky movement.

It is run by the British Astronomical Association (BAA) and affiliated with the International Dark-Sky Association (IDA), and composed of a network of local officers (and other members) who try to improve lighting in their areas and advise local people.

The campaign was founded in 1989 by amateur astronomers as a sub-section of the BAA specialising in combatting skyglow. It is now open to non-members of the BAA, includes lighting engineers and environmentalists, and campaigns on the wider effects of light pollution.

In April 2023, the founder and coordinator of CfDS, Robert Mizon MBE died. Following a period of mourning and readjustment, the Commission was relaunched in November 2024 with new officers and committee members, tasked to reinvigorate the campaign to reduce light pollution and preserve and protect the UK's dark skies.

As of June 2026 the CfDS elected James Verner FRAS to take over the role of Chairperson. Verner is already a well known advocate on issues relating to stewardship of the night sky specialising on the impacts of satellite constellations and light pollution on astronomy, the biosphere and humanity's cultural relationship with the night sky. Verner is an active member of the IAU Centre for the Protection of the Dark and Quiet Sky (IAU-CPS), the IAU Pro-Am Working Group, and is listed as a Director of Dark Sky UK, the UK arm of Dark Sky International. While formal public records are limited, Verner is reportedly an advisor to the All Party Parliamentary Group for Dark Skies. This cross-party group of Peers and MPs advises the British Government on policy related to the protection of the night sky.

== Legislation ==
CfDS's work with the House of Commons Science and Technology Committee on legislating against light pollution has resulted in the government including provisions in their Clean Neighbourhoods and Environment Bill.

== Dark sky park, island and reserve ==
Members of the CfDS have been involved in the following International Dark-Sky Association designations:

- Galloway Forest Park – Dark Sky Park (2009)
- Sark – IDA's first international dark-sky island (Silver tier) (2011)
- Exmoor – Dark Sky Reserve (2011)
- Elan Valley Estate (mid-Wales) Dark Sky Park (2015)
- Tomintoul and Glenlivet-Cairngorms Dark Sky Park (2018)

== Publications ==
In 2009, the CfDS published its handbook Blinded by the Light?.

== Conferences ==
- CfDS 2006: Dark-Skies Symposium, Portsmouth, UK, September 15–16, 2006.
- Exterior lighting, statutory nuisance and light pollution, De Montfort University, April, 2006.
- Planning, Exterior Lighting and the Environment, De Montfort University, 20 April 2012.
