= Light pollution in Hong Kong =

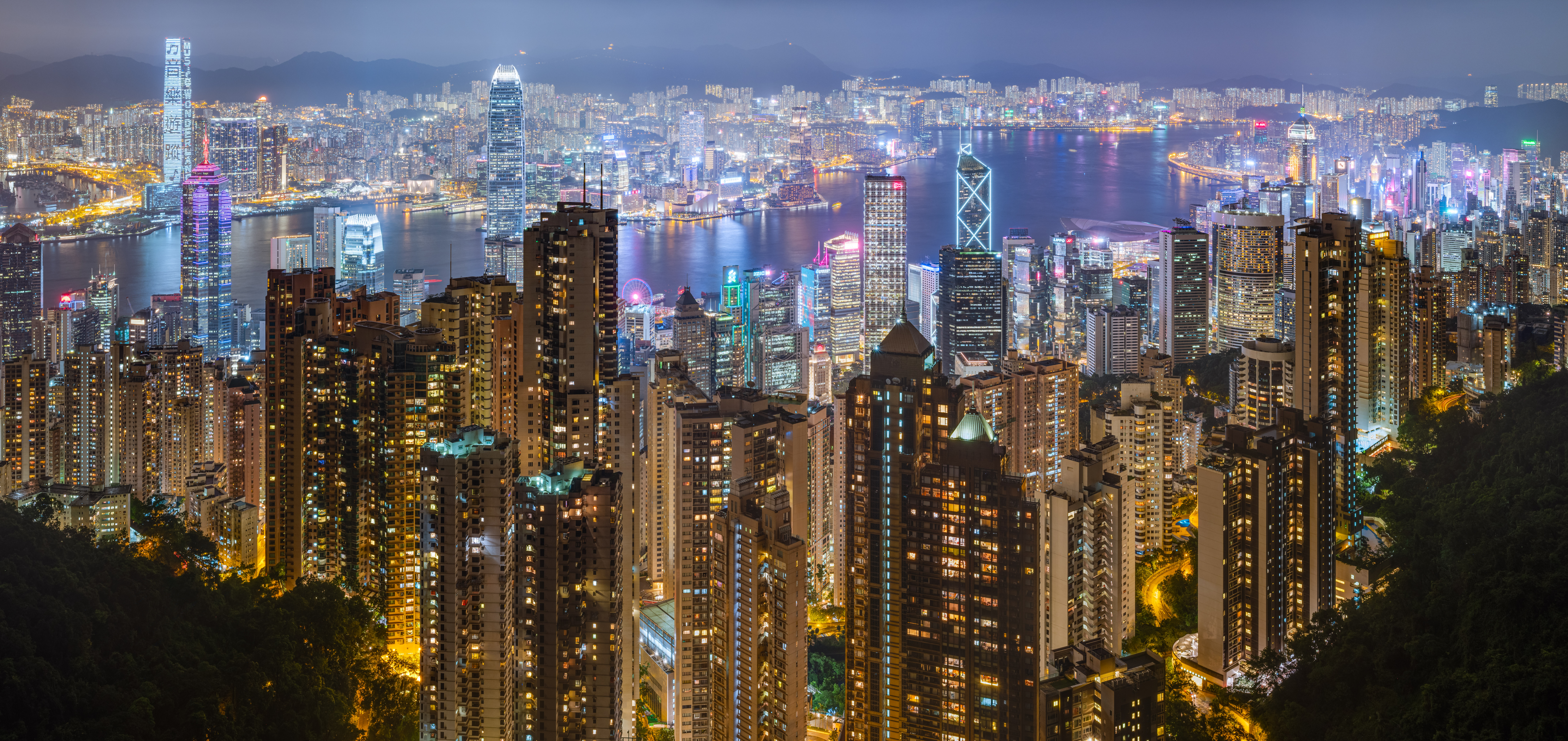
Skyline of Hong Kong at night

Hong Kong has been named the world's worst city for light pollution. Commercial and residential areas Mong Kok, Tsim Sha Tsui, and Causeway Bay are found to be the most severe areas of light pollution. Due to the spotlights and LED billboards, Hong Kong’s sky is many times brighter than other cities.

== Background ==
The issue of light pollution in Hong Kong rose to public prominence in 2008, and the government initiated a policy review the following year, culminating in the 2011–2015 "Task Force on External Lighting" to look into the problem, including two rounds of public consultation in 2013. It recommended that no rules or legislation should be introduced, as there was “no 'majority' opinion on the issue”. In April 2016, the government followed the task force's suggestion to introduce merely a voluntary "Charter on External Lighting" under which businesses might agree to turn off external lighting between 11:00 PM and 6:00 AM.

Separately, the topic also gained academic interest. The Department of Physics at the University of Hong Kong took measurements from a number of locations in Hong Kong and ranked them against a benchmark of "normal dark sky", and found that the highest level of light pollution was the Hong Kong Tsim Sha Tsui was on average 1000 times brighter than the benchmark, and the worst reading in the world. Apart from that, a survey by four students from Worcester Polytechnic Institute in Massachusetts discovered that the light of the neon signs from buildings in Causeway Bay was 176 lux bright and Mong Kok was about 150 to 500 lux, which is far higher than what British agencies recommend. Even at the Hong Kong Wetland Park in Tin Shui Wai, the brightness was 130 times higher than the International Astronomical Union standard. The rise of complaints also reveals the seriousness of the problem. The number of complaints has increased from 87 in 2007 to 377 in 2009. In brief, the problem of light pollution has not only appeared in commercial areas like Mong Kok and Causeway Bay, but also in the residential areas outside the urban centre. Cheng Sze Ling, environment affairs officer of Friends of the Earth, said “Light pollution is no longer endemic but has evolved into an infectious disease across the city”.

A Symphony of Lights, a show for tourists, has been criticised for contributing to light pollution.

== Effects ==
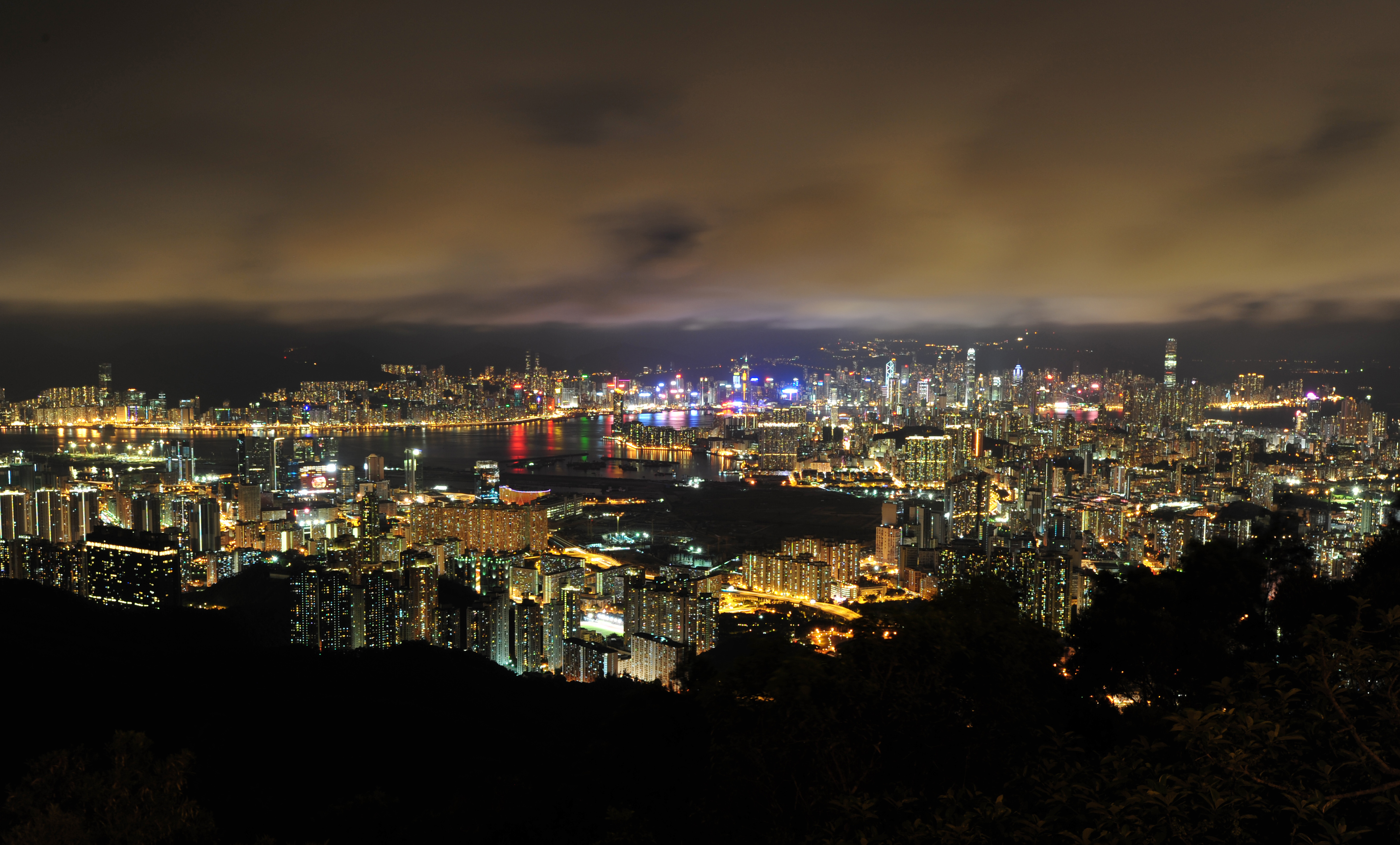
A 2011 panorama of Hong Kong viewed from Sha Tin

=== On neighbourhoods ===
In heavily mixed residential developments such as Mong Kok and Sham Shui Po, some residents have trouble sleeping as they have strong neon lights shining through their bedroom windows, emitted by billboards. Some precincts have been described as being lit up like football stadiums.

=== On human beings ===
Excessive amounts of light can disrupt the circadian rhythm of humans, which affects some physiological process, including brain wave patterns, hormone production, and cell regulation. The disruption of the circadian rhythm is shown to cause depression and other mood disorders in humans, as well as cardiovascular diseases and cancers. Increased rates in breast cancer have been linked to the exposure to artificial light at night (ALAN).

=== On animals ===
Light pollution has a significant effect on flora and fauna. Excess artificial light can change the night habits, such as reproduction and migration, of nocturnal animals. In the remote Sai Kung countryside, the light emitted from large LED billboards in the city can affect the reproduction of fireflies, an insect that relies on light signals to mate. According to the Hong Kong Entomological Society chairman Yiu Vor, they emit their signal less frequently, affecting their survival.

Light pollution has similar negative effects on animals native to the Hong Kong area. Artificial light at night can mask maritime animal migration, change animals' predation patterns and cause a failure of coral spawning, all of which directly impact the animals in the oceans around Hong Kong. Excess artificial light in the form of streetlamps has been found to seriously affect the sea finding behavior of green sea turtle hatchlings, who depend on natural light as clues to find the ocean. Nocturnal bats, of which several species are native to Hong Kong, are subjected to several negative effects of light pollution. Foraging in areas illuminated by artificial lights, as bats have been known to do, increases their risk of being caught by predators. Flying along streetlamps has also been linked to the increased mortal risk of being hit by moving vehicles.

== Voluntary guidelines on external lighting ==
As Hong Kong’s commercial and residential areas are not strictly separated, it is difficult to combat light pollution, as no simple regulation rule can be applied to these merged zones. The government currently imposes no laws to regulate excessive lighting. Instead, a Task Force on External Lighting set up by the Environment Bureau has issued the "Guidelines on Industry Best Practices for External Lighting Installations". However, it is carried out on a voluntary basis by the industry and is thus criticized as "toothless." The lawmakers are still investigating the need to set up specific laws in regulating external lighting. Yet, opinions are divided. While residents generally welcome the idea, the tourism and advertising industries both rely on lighting to boost business. Some opponents to a "lights-out" argue that the city's night view is a unique feature of Hong Kong that should not be lost through legislation.

In 2015, the Task Force on External Lighting's recommendation that light pollution in Hong Kong be tackled by a voluntary charter, stating that it found Hong Kong was not yet ready for a legislative solution to the issue, was met with great disappointment from the Legislative Council committee on environmental affairs. The task force recommended a two-year scheme in which merchants will be asked to turn off outdoor lighting voluntarily by 11:00 PM. Committee chairman Kenneth Chan said the government had given in to pressure from the commercial sector, which was opposed to any curbs on external lighting.

== See also ==
- Lights Out Hong Kong
