= Light pollution =

Excess artificial light in an environment

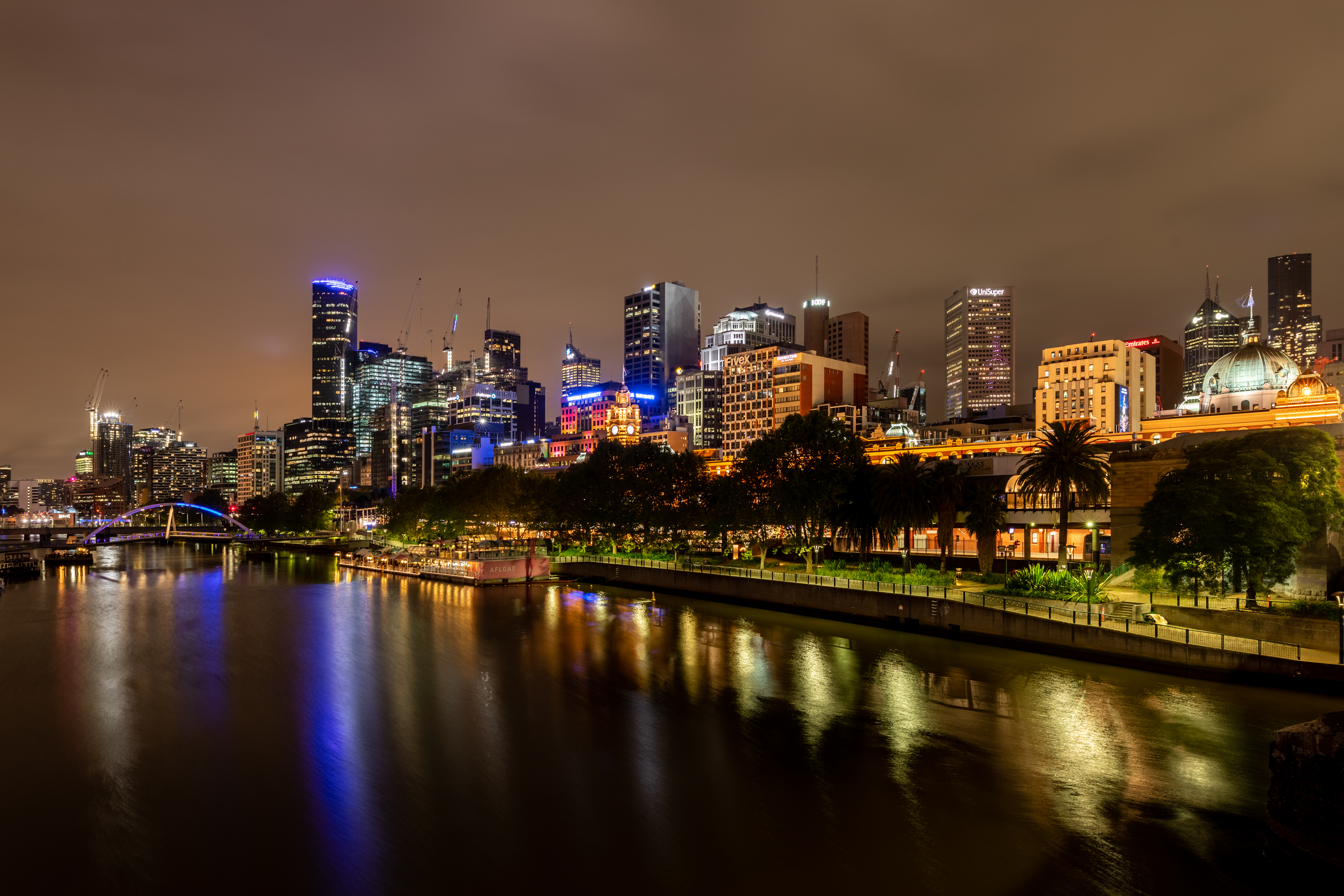
Light pollution over Melbourne, Australia

Light pollution is the alteration of the natural patterns of light and dark in ecosystems, resulting from the unnecessary and inefficient use of artificial lighting. Specific categories of light pollution include light trespass, over-illumination, glare, light clutter, and skyglow. A single offending light source often falls into more than one of these categories.

Although this type of pollution can exist throughout the day, its effects are magnified during the night with the contrast of the sky's darkness. It has been estimated that 83% of the world's people live under light-polluted skies and that 23% of the world's land area is affected by skyglow. The area affected by artificial illumination continues to increase. A major side effect of urbanization, light pollution is blamed for compromising health, disrupting ecosystems, and spoiling aesthetic environments. Studies show that urban areas are more at risk. Globally, it has increased by at least 49% from 1992 to 2017, and between 2014 and 2022 by 16%, with uneven development, e.g. France reducing through policy its light pollution by 33% in that time period.

Solutions to light pollution are often steps like adjusting light fixtures or using more appropriate light bulbs. Further remediation can be done with more efforts to educate the public in order to push legislative change. However, because it is a man-made phenomenon, addressing its impacts on humans and the environment has political, social, and economic considerations.

== Definitions ==
Light pollution is the presence of artificial light in otherwise dark conditions.

The term is most commonly used in relation to in the outdoor environment and surrounding, but is also used to refer to artificial light indoors. Adverse consequences are multiple; some of them may not be known yet. Light pollution makes it harder for people in cities that use excessive artificial light and, like other pollutants, it can harm our environment. Light pollution is a side-effect of industrial civilization. Its sources include building exterior and interior lighting, advertising, outdoor area lighting (such as car parks), offices, factories, streetlights, and illuminated sporting venues. It is most severe in highly industrialized, densely populated areas of North America, Europe, and Asia and in major cities in the Middle East and North Africa like Tehran and Cairo, but even relatively small amounts of light can be noticed and create problems. Awareness of the harmful effects of light pollution began in the second half of the 19th century, but efforts to address its effects did not begin until the 1950s. In the 1980s a global dark-sky movement emerged with the founding of the International Dark-Sky Association (now DarkSky International). There are now such educational and advocacy organizations in many countries worldwide.

About 83% of people, including 99% of Europeans and Americans, live under light-polluted skies that are more than 10% brighter than natural darkness. 80% of North Americans cannot see the Milky Way galaxy.

== Types ==
A light pollution source, using a broad spectrum metal halide lamp, pointing upward at Uniqema factory, Gouda, the Netherlands

=== Light trespass ===
Light trespass occurs when unwanted light enters one's property. A common light trespass problem occurs when a strong light enters the window of one's home from the outside, causing problems such as sleep deprivation. A number of cities in the U.S. have developed standards for outdoor lighting to protect the rights of their citizens against light trespass.

DarkSky International was started to reduce the light going up into the sky which reduces the visibility of stars (see Skyglow below). This is any light that is emitted more than 90° above nadir. By limiting light at this 90° mark they have also reduced the light output in the 80–90° range which creates most of the light trespass issues.

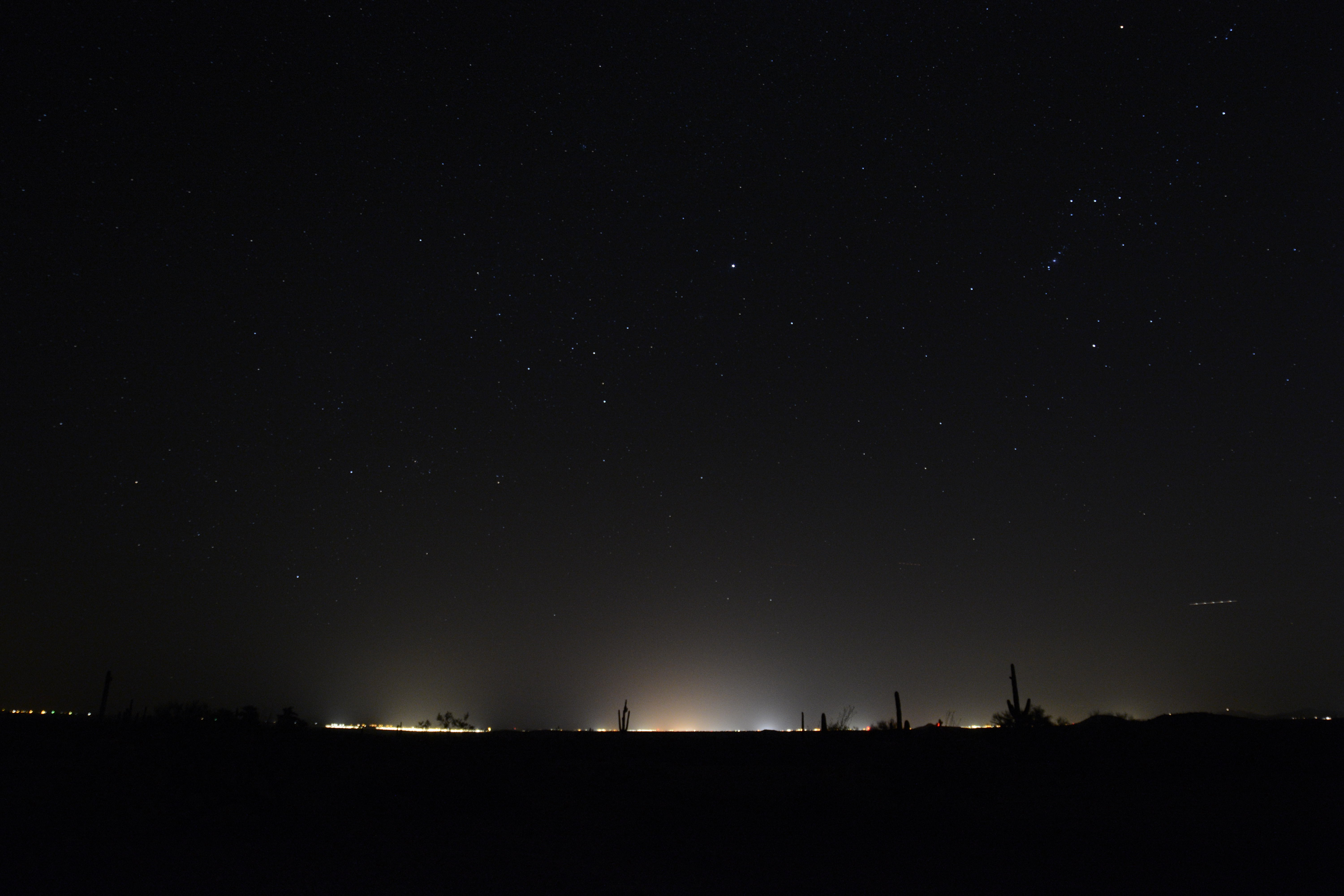
The city of Phoenix, seen from 55 miles (89 km) away in Surprise, Arizona

U.S. federal agencies may also enforce standards and process complaints within their areas of jurisdiction. For instance, in the case of light trespass by white strobe lighting from communication towers in excess of FAA minimum lighting requirements the Federal Communications Commission maintains an Antenna Structure Registration database information which citizens may use to identify offending structures and provides a mechanism for processing citizen inquiries and complaints. The U.S. Green Building Council (USGBC) has also incorporated a credit for reducing the amount of light trespass and sky glow into their environmentally friendly building standard known as LEED.

Light trespass can be reduced by selecting light fixtures that limit the amount of light emitted more than 80° above the nadir. The IESNA definitions include full cutoff (0%), cutoff (10%), and semi-cutoff (20%). (These definitions also include limits on light emitted above 90° to reduce sky glow.)

=== Over-illumination ===
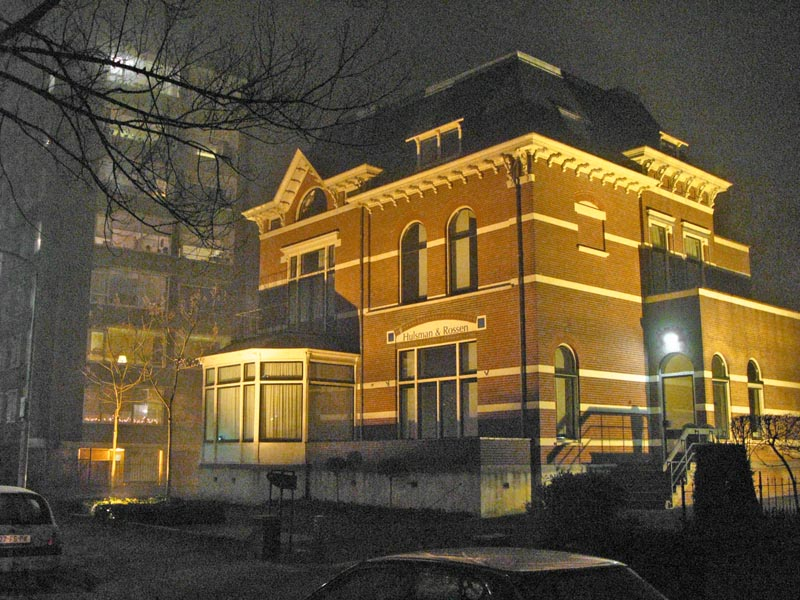
An office building is illuminated by high-pressure sodium (HPS) lamps shining upward. Much light goes into the sky and neighboring apartment blocks, causing light pollution.

Over-illumination is the excessive and unnecessary use of light.

A large and overabundant amount of electricity is required to support light consumption in the United States. U.S homes consumed 81 billion kilowatt hours (kWh) of electricity for lighting in 2020 according to the U.S. Energy Information Administration (EIA). Additionally, the EIA reported that 208 billion kWh and 53 billion kWh of electricity were used for commercial and manufacturing buildings respectively in 2018.

Light use is not excessive in all developed countries. Amongst developed countries there are large variations in patterns of light use. American cities emit three to five times more light to space per capita compared to German cities.

Over-illumination stems from several factors:

- Consensus-based standards or norms that are not based on vision science;
- The common misconception that increased illumination equals increased safety despite it having no proven effect and may worsen the problem;
- Improper design, by specifying higher levels of light than needed for a given visual task;
- Incorrect choice of fixtures or light bulbs, which do not direct light into areas as needed;
- Improper selection of hardware to utilize more energy than needed to accomplish the lighting task;
- Incomplete training of building managers and occupants to use lighting systems efficiently;
- Inadequate lighting maintenance resulting in increased stray light and energy costs;
- "Daylight lighting" demanded by citizens to reduce crime or by shop owners to attract customers;
- Substitution of old lamps with more efficient LEDs using the same electrical power; and
- Indirect lighting techniques, such as illuminating a vertical wall to bounce light onto the ground.
- Institutions who illuminate their buildings not to improve navigation, but "to show that its empire is inescapable".
- Lighting less for the benefit of seeing at night, and more for institutions to push working hours beyond natural daylight hours. An economic and financial gain as opposed to a necessity.

Most of these issues can be readily corrected with available, inexpensive technology, and with the resolution of landlord/tenant practices that create barriers to rapid correction of these matters. Most importantly, public awareness would need to improve for industrialized countries to realize the large payoff in reducing over-illumination.

In certain cases, an over-illumination lighting technique may be needed. For example, indirect lighting is often used to obtain a "softer" look, since hard direct lighting is generally found less desirable for certain surfaces, such as skin. The indirect lighting method is perceived as cozier and suits bars, restaurants, and living quarters. It is also possible to block the direct lighting effect by adding softening filters or other solutions, though intensity will be reduced.

=== Glare ===
Glare can be categorized into different types. One such classification is described in a book by Bob Mizon, coordinator for the British Astronomical Association's Campaign for Dark Skies, as follows:

- Blinding glare describes effects such as that caused by staring into the Sun. It is completely blinding and leaves temporary or permanent vision deficiencies.
- Disability glare describes effects such as being blinded by oncoming car lights, or light scattering in fog or in the eye, reducing contrast, as well as reflections from print and other dark areas that render them bright, with a significant reduction in sight capabilities.
- Discomfort glare does not typically cause a dangerous situation in itself, though it is annoying and irritating at best. It can potentially cause fatigue if experienced over extended periods.

According to Mario Motta, president of the Massachusetts Medical Society, "... glare from bad lighting is a public-health hazard—especially the older you become. Glare light scattering in the eye causes loss of contrast and leads to unsafe driving conditions, much like the glare on a dirty windshield from low-angle sunlight or the high beams from an oncoming car." In essence bright and/or badly shielded lights around roads can partially blind drivers or pedestrians and contribute to accidents.

The blinding effect is caused in large part by reduced contrast due to light scattering in the eye by excessive brightness, or to the reflection of light from dark areas in the field of vision, with luminance similar to the background luminance. This kind of glare is a particular instance of disability glare, called veiling glare. (This is not the same as loss of accommodation of night vision which is caused by the direct effect of the light itself on the eye.)

=== Light clutter ===
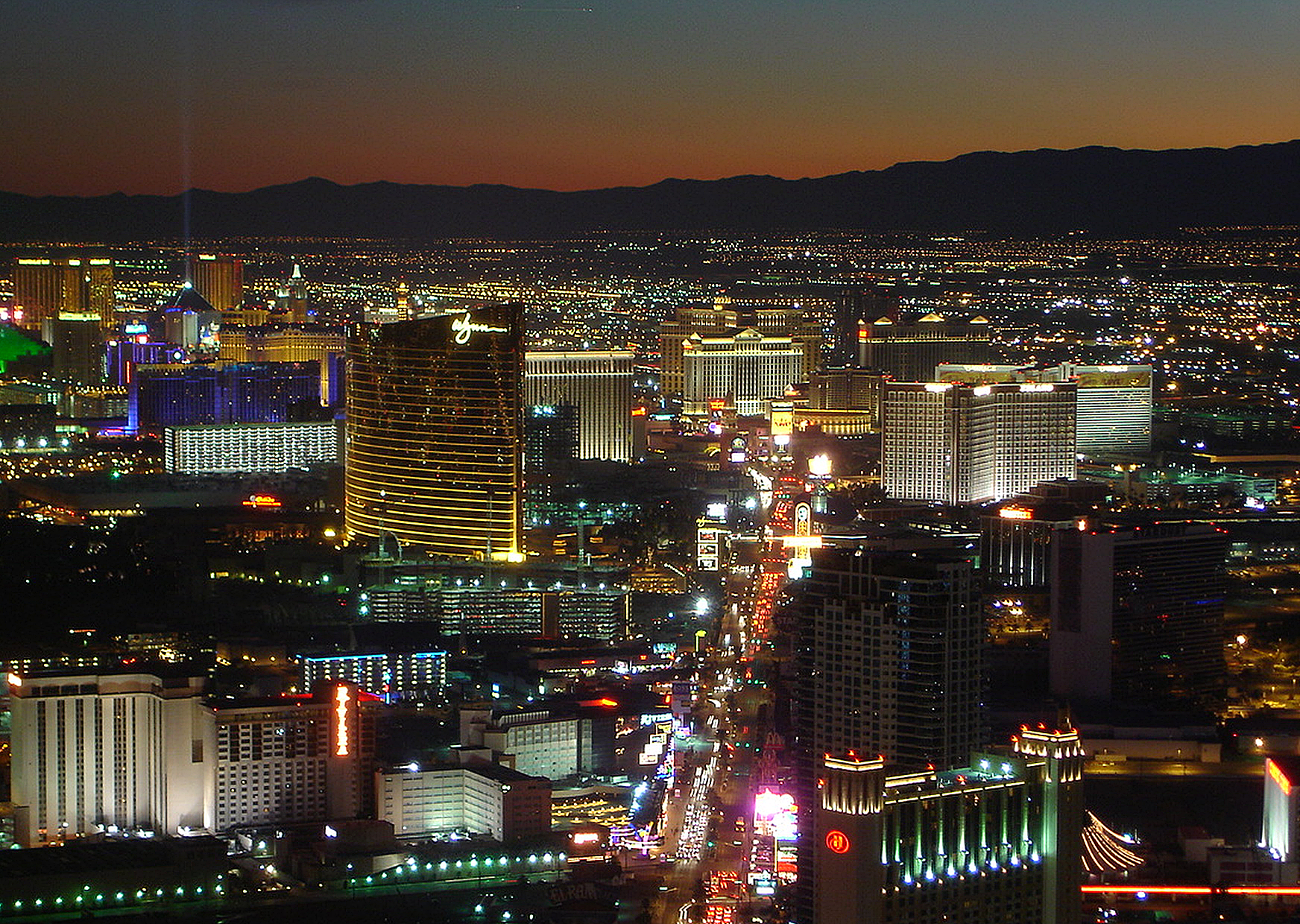
The Las Vegas Strip displays excessive groupings of colorful lights. This is a classic example of light clutter.

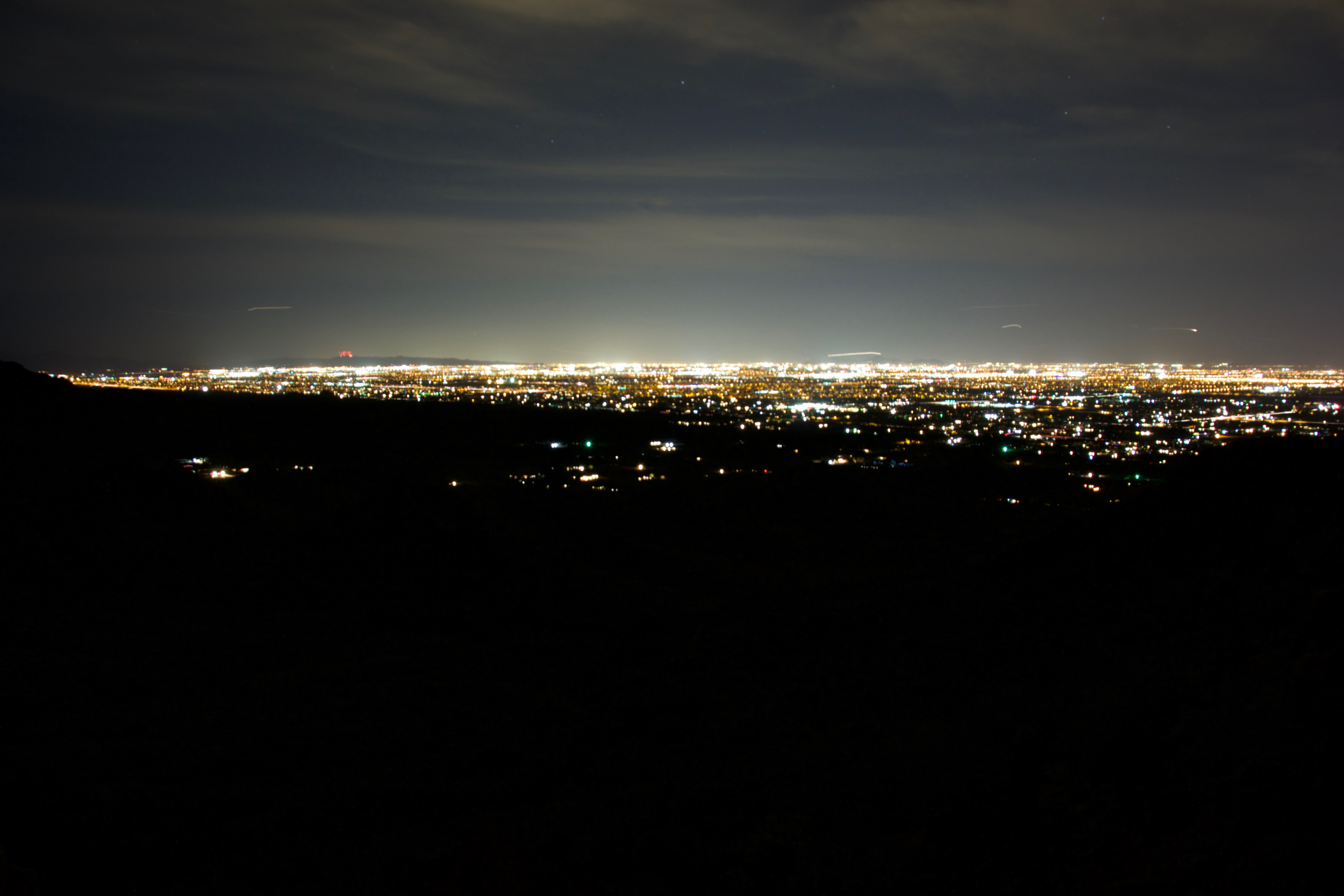
View of the Phoenix metro area from the top of Goldmine Trail in the San Tan Mountains

Light clutter refers to excessive groupings of lights. Groupings of lights may generate confusion, distract from obstacles (including those that they may be intended to illuminate), and potentially cause accidents. Clutter is particularly noticeable on roads where the street lights are badly designed, or where brightly lit advertisements surround the roadways. Depending on the motives of the person or organization that installed the lights, their placement and design can even be intended to distract drivers, and can contribute to accidents.

=== Sky glow ===
Sky glow is the bright haze above cities that is produced from excessive artificial lighting at night. This type of light pollution is created from artificial light reflecting in the sky and bouncing around the different types of particles that reside in the atmosphere The effect of sky glow can be harmful in astronomy and on the health of many organisms. It worsens the visibility of the stars, the Milky Way, and significantly and unnaturally increases the light levels at night.

=== From satellites ===
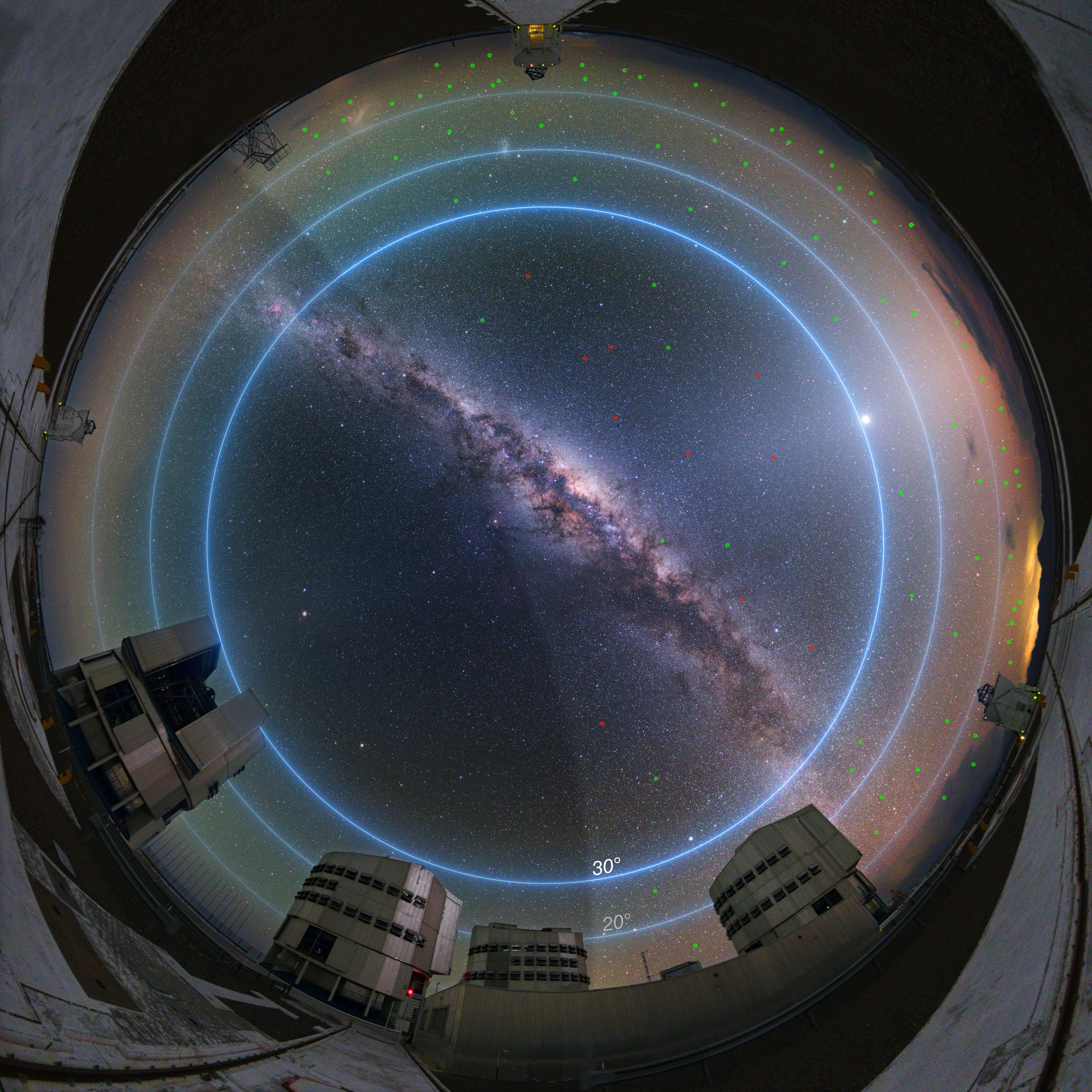
Visibility of satellites during twilight marked green and red. 30° above the horizon is where most astronomical observations take place. In Earth's shadow, represented by the darker area on the left, satellites become practically invisible.

Also contributing to light pollution are artificial satellites. With increasing numbers of satellite constellations such as OneWeb, Starlink, and Kuiper, members of the astronomical community, notably the IAU, fear that light pollution will increase significantly, one of many concerns reported in the media regarding satellite overcrowding. Public discourse surrounding the continuing deployment of satellite constellations includes multiple petitions by astronomers and citizen scientists, and has raised questions about which regulatory bodies hold jurisdiction over human actions that obscure starlight.

=== Underwater light pollution ===
Light pollution occurs underwater.

== Measurement ==
=== Issues to measuring light pollution ===
Measuring the effect of sky glow on a global scale is a complex procedure. The natural atmosphere is not completely dark, even in the absence of terrestrial sources of light and illumination from the Moon. This is caused by two main sources: airglow and scattered light.

At high altitudes, primarily above the mesosphere, there is enough UV radiation from the sun at very short wavelengths to cause ionization. When the ions collide with electrically neutral particles they recombine and emit photons in the process, causing airglow. The degree of ionization is sufficiently large to allow a constant emission of radiation even during the night when the upper atmosphere is in the Earth's shadow. Lower in the atmosphere all the solar photons with energies above the ionization potential of N_{2} and O_{2} have already been absorbed by the higher layers and thus no appreciable ionization occurs.

Apart from emitting light, the sky also scatters incoming light, primarily from distant stars and the Milky Way, but also the zodiacal light, sunlight that is reflected and backscattered from interplanetary dust particles.

The amount of airglow and zodiacal light is quite varied (depending, amongst other things on sunspot activity and the Solar cycle) but given optimal conditions, the darkest possible sky has a brightness of about 22 magnitude/square arcsecond. If a full moon is present, the sky brightness increases to about 18 magnitude/sq. arcsecond depending on local atmospheric transparency, 40 times brighter than the darkest sky. In densely populated areas a sky brightness of 17 magnitude/sq. arcsecond is not uncommon, or as much as 100 times brighter than is natural.

=== Satellite imagery measuring ===
To precisely measure how bright the sky gets, night time satellite imagery of the earth is used as raw input for the number and intensity of light sources. These are put into a physical model of scattering due to air molecules and aerosoles to calculate cumulative sky brightness. Maps that show the enhanced sky brightness have been prepared for the entire world.

=== Ground-based monitoring ===
In addition to satellite-based observations, ground-based networks of photometers have become essential for monitoring light pollution over time. One of the most widely used instruments is the Sky Quality Meter (SQM), a compact device that measures night sky brightness (NSB) in magnitudes per square arcsecond. SQMs are deployed by both professional observatories and citizen scientists worldwide, providing high temporal resolution data that complements remote sensing approaches.

Long-term SQM datasets from urban, intermediate, and rural sites have revealed measurable increases in light pollution. A 2023 study analyzing over a decade of data from 26 sites across Europe - including cities such as Stockholm, Berlin, and Vienna - found average annual increases in NSB of 1.7% in rural areas, 1.8% in urban areas, and 3.7% in intermediate areas. These trends were corrected for sensor aging using twilight calibration methods and adjusted for atmospheric factors such as albedo, vegetation cover, and aerosols through an empirical regression model.

Ground-based studies have also shown that high levels of artificial light at night can suppress the natural circalunar pattern in sky brightness. In urban areas where the NSB exceeds 16.5 mag/arcsec², the variation associated with the moon cycle becomes nearly undetectable, potentially affecting species that rely on moonlight for behavior or navigation.

National SQM networks have been established in several countries. In Austria, the provincial government of Upper Austria operates a dense SQM network to support both astronomical and environmental research. In Spain, coordinated efforts by researchers including Bará and colleagues have helped quantify the relative contributions of streetlights, traffic, and residential lighting to NSB. In Italy, SQM data have been used to monitor urban and protected areas. The Netherlands also maintains a national monitoring program using SQMs to track long-term trends.

These ground-based networks provide continuous data under varied weather conditions and offer a crucial complement to satellite observations, especially for evaluating local lighting policies and environmental impacts.

=== Bortle scale ===
The Bortle scale is a nine-level measuring system used to track how much light pollution there is in the sky. A Bortle scale of four or less is required to see the Milky Way whilst one is "pristine", the darkest possible.

== Global impact ==
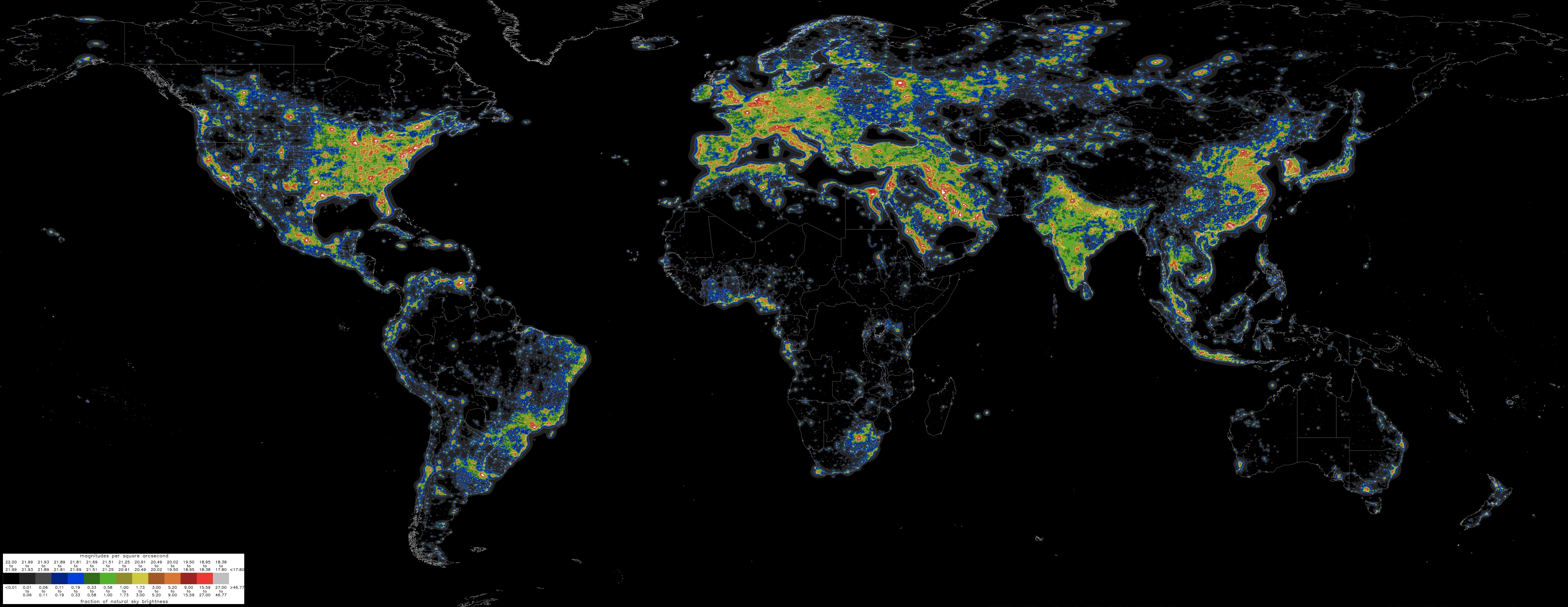
World map of light pollution. False colors show intensities of skyglow from artificial light sources around the world.

NASA video of a nighttime view of Earth, dubbed the Black Marble

=== Europe ===
Inspection of the area surrounding Madrid reveals that the effects of light pollution caused by a single large conglomeration can be felt up to 100 km (62 mi) away from the center.

Global effects of light pollution are also made obvious. Research in the late 1990s showed that the entire area consisting of southern England, Netherlands, Belgium, West Germany, and northern France have a sky brightness of at least two to four times normal. The only places in continental Europe where the sky can attain its natural darkness are in northern Scandinavia and in islands far from the continent. The growth of light pollution on the green band has been 11% from 2012–2013 to 2014–2020, and 24% on the blue band.

=== North America ===
In North America the situation is comparable. There is a significant problem with light pollution ranging from the Canadian Maritime Provinces to the American Southwest. DarkSky International works to designate areas that have high-quality night skies. These areas are supported by communities and organizations that are dedicated to reducing light pollution (e.g. Dark-sky preserve). The National Park Service Natural Sounds and Night Skies Division has measured night sky quality in national park units across the U.S. Sky quality in the U.S. ranges from pristine (Capitol Reef National Park and Big Bend National Park) to severely degraded (Santa Monica Mountains National Recreation Area and Biscayne National Park). The National Park Service Night Sky Program monitoring database is available online (2015).

=== East Asia ===
Light pollution in Hong Kong was declared the 'worst on the planet' in March 2013.

In June 2016, it was estimated that one third of the world's population could no longer see the Milky Way, including 80% of Americans and 60% of Europeans. Singapore was found to be the most light-polluted country in the world.

Over the past 21 years, China's provincial capital cities have seen a major increase in light pollution, with hotspots along the eastern coastline region.

=== Africa ===
80% of Africa's protected areas have experienced "increased pressure from artificial lights".

Light pollution poses a significant threat for nocturnal pollinators in Africa.

== Consequences ==
Light pollution has "detrimental impacts on wildlife, human health, and ecosystem functions and services". Only the damage to ecosystems is estimated as 3.36 trillion dollars per year. Ecosystems which are suffering from the highest level of light pollution, deliver 40% less ecological services.

=== Public health impact ===
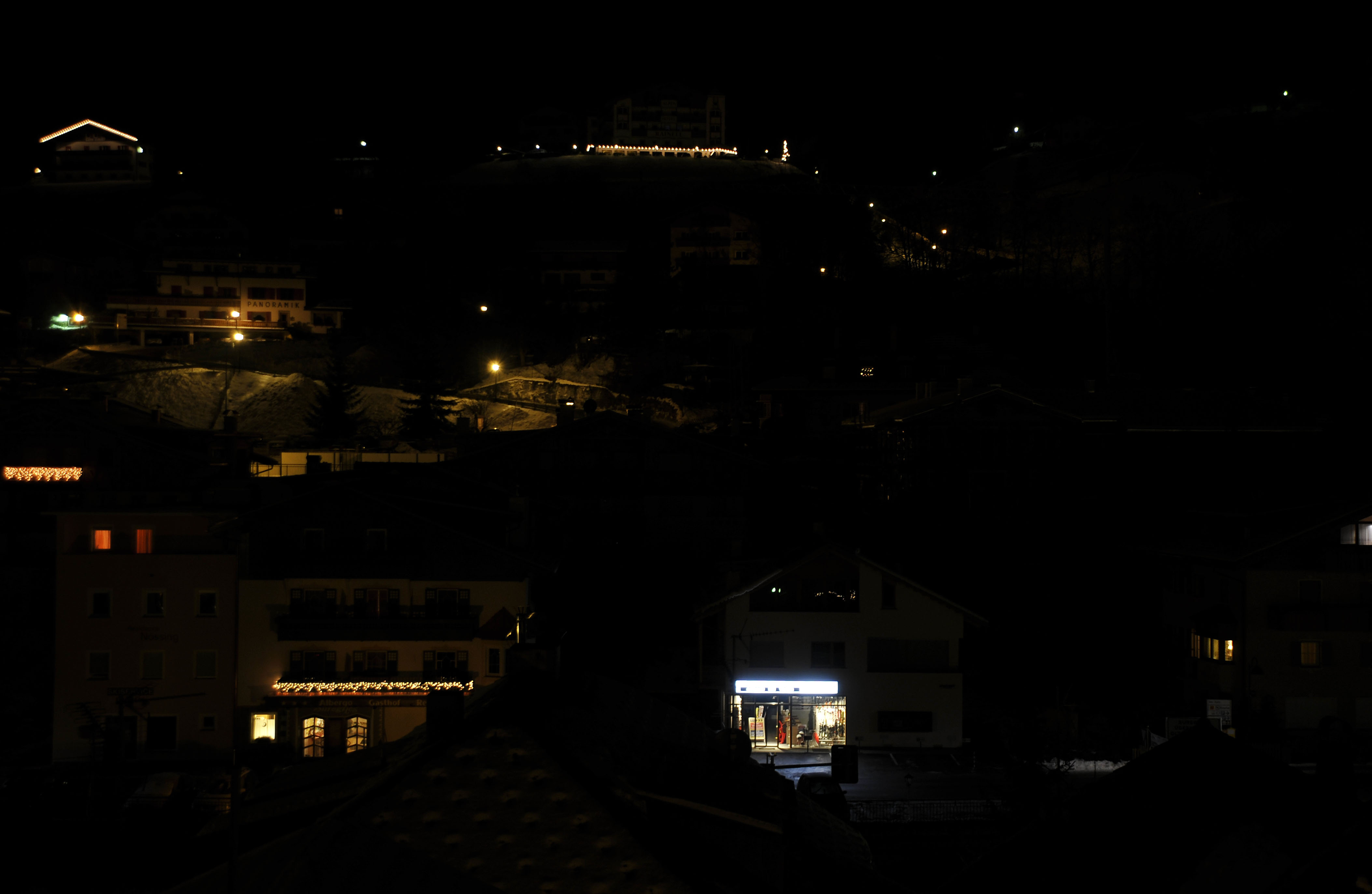
Streetlights at the ski resort Kastelruth in South Tyrol, Italy

Medical research on the effects of excessive light on the human body suggests that a variety of adverse health effects may be caused by light pollution or excessive light exposure, and some lighting design textbooks use human health as an explicit criterion for proper interior lighting. Health effects of over-illumination or improper spectral composition of light may include: increased headache incidence, worker fatigue, medically defined stress, decrease in sexual function and increase in anxiety. Likewise, animal models have been studied demonstrating unavoidable light to produce adverse effect on mood and anxiety. For those who need to be awake at night, light at night also has an acute effect on alertness and mood.

Outdoor artificial light at night – exposure to contemporary types such as current types of street lighting – has been linked to risks for obesity, mental disorders, diabetes, and potentially other health issues by preliminary studies.

In 2007, "shift work that involves circadian disruption" was listed as a probable carcinogen by the World Health Organization's International Agency for Research on Cancer. (IARC Press release No. 180). Multiple studies have documented a correlation between night shift work and the increased incidence of breast and prostate cancer. One study which examined the link between exposure to artificial light at night (ALAN) and levels of breast cancer in South Korea found that regions which had the highest levels of ALAN reported the highest number of cases of breast cancer. Seoul, which had the highest levels of light pollution, had 34.4% more cases of breast cancer than Ganwon-do, which had the lowest levels of light pollution. This suggested a high correlation between ALAN and the prevalence of breast cancer. It was also found that there was no correlation between other types of cancer such as cervical or lung cancer and ALAN levels.

A more recent discussion (2009), written by Professor Steven Lockley, Harvard Medical School, can be found in the CfDS handbook "Blinded by the Light?". Chapter 4, "Human health implications of light pollution" states that "... light intrusion, even if dim, is likely to have measurable effects on sleep disruption and melatonin suppression. Even if these effects are relatively small from night to night, continuous chronic circadian, sleep and hormonal disruption may have longer-term health risks". The New York Academy of Sciences hosted a meeting in 2009 on Circadian Disruption and Cancer. In different wavelengths of light, red light has the least inhibitory effect on melatonin.

In June 2009, the American Medical Association developed a policy in support of control of light pollution. News about the decision emphasized glare as a public health hazard leading to unsafe driving conditions. Especially in the elderly, glare produces loss of contrast, obscuring night vision.

A new 2021 study published in the Southern Economic Journal indicates that light pollution may increase by 13% in preterm births before 23 weeks of gestation.

A new longitudinal Chinese preliminary study indicated that exposure to artificial lights "could increase the risks of hypertension, heart disease, and stroke".

=== Ecological impact ===
While light at night can be beneficial, neutral, or damaging for individual species, its presence invariably disturbs ecosystems. For example, some species of spiders avoid lit areas, while other species are happy to build their webs directly on lamp posts. Since lamp posts attract many flying insects, the spiders that tolerate the light gain an advantage over the spiders that avoid it. This is a simple example of the way in which species frequencies and food webs can be disturbed by the introduction of light at night. Another animal that light pollution heavily affects is sea turtles. When turtles hatch, they rely on their senses to guide them to the ocean and at times they mistake artificial light for the natural horizon light.

Light pollution poses a serious threat in particular to nocturnal wildlife, having negative impacts on plant and animal physiology. It can confuse animal navigation, alter competitive interactions, change predator-prey relations, and cause physiological harm. The rhythm of life is orchestrated by the natural diurnal patterns of light and dark, so disruption to these patterns impacts the ecological dynamics. Many species of marine plankton, such as Calanus copepods, can detect light levels as low as 0.1 μWm^{−2}; using this as a threshold a global atlas of marine Artificial Light at Night has been generated, showing its global widespread nature.

Studies suggest that light pollution around lakes prevents zooplankton, such as Daphnia, from eating surface algae, causing algal blooms that can kill off the lakes' plants and lower water quality. Light pollution may also affect ecosystems in other ways. For example, entomologists have documented that nighttime light may interfere with the ability of moths and other nocturnal insects to navigate. It can also negative impact on insect development and reproduction. Night-blooming flowers that depend on moths for pollination may be affected by night lighting, as there is no replacement pollinator that would not be affected by the artificial light. This can lead to species decline of plants that are unable to reproduce, and change an area's long-term ecology. Among nocturnal insects, fireflies (Coleoptera: Lampyridae, Phengodidae and Elateridae) are especially interesting study objects for light pollution, as they depend on their own light to reproduce and, consequently, are very sensitive to environmental levels of light. Fireflies are well known and interesting to the general public (unlike many other insects) and are easily spotted by non-experts, and, due to their sensibility and rapid response to environmental changes, good bioindicators for artificial night lighting. Significant declines in some insect populations have been suggested as being at least partially mediated by artificial lights at night.

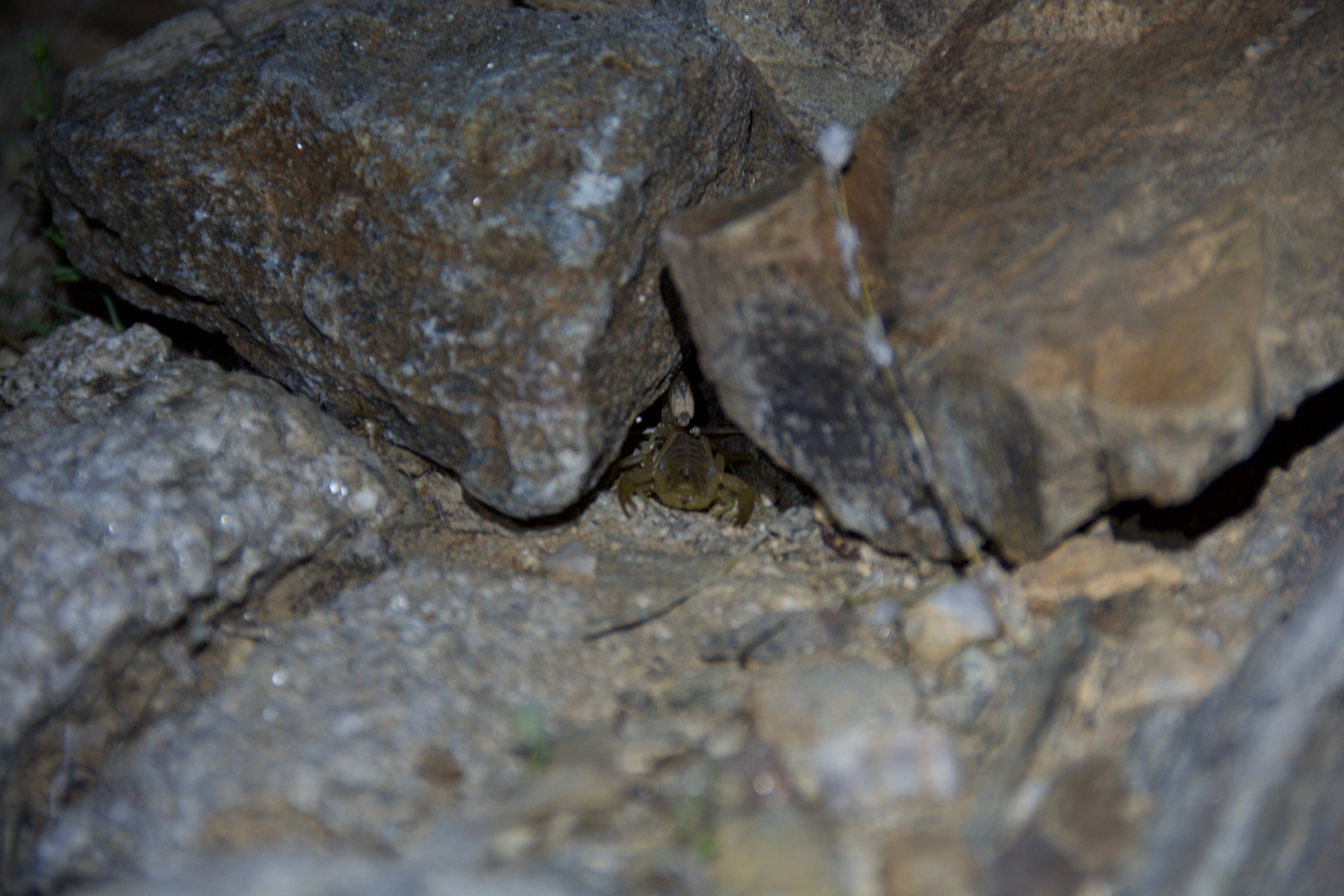
A scorpion hides under rocks.

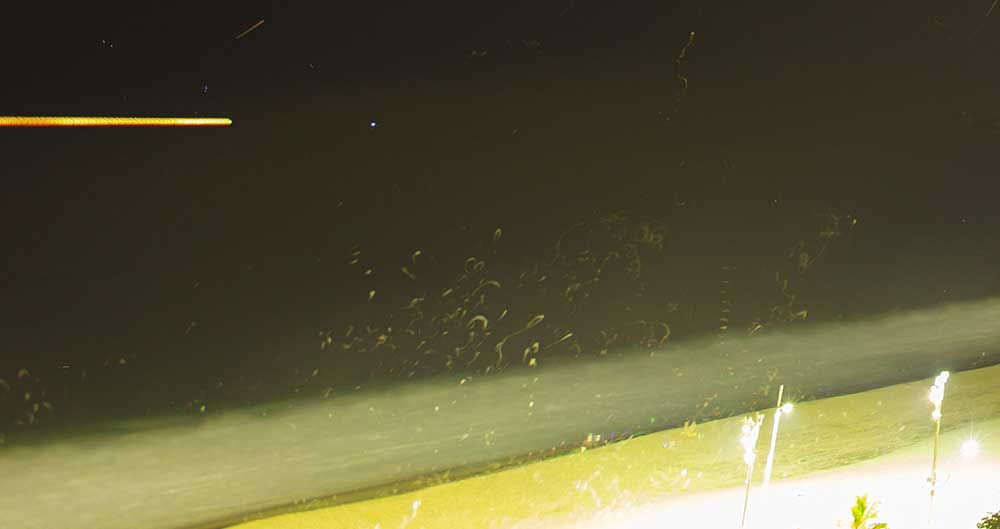
Birds flying trace and star trail near Rio de Janeiro beach at night time in light pollution

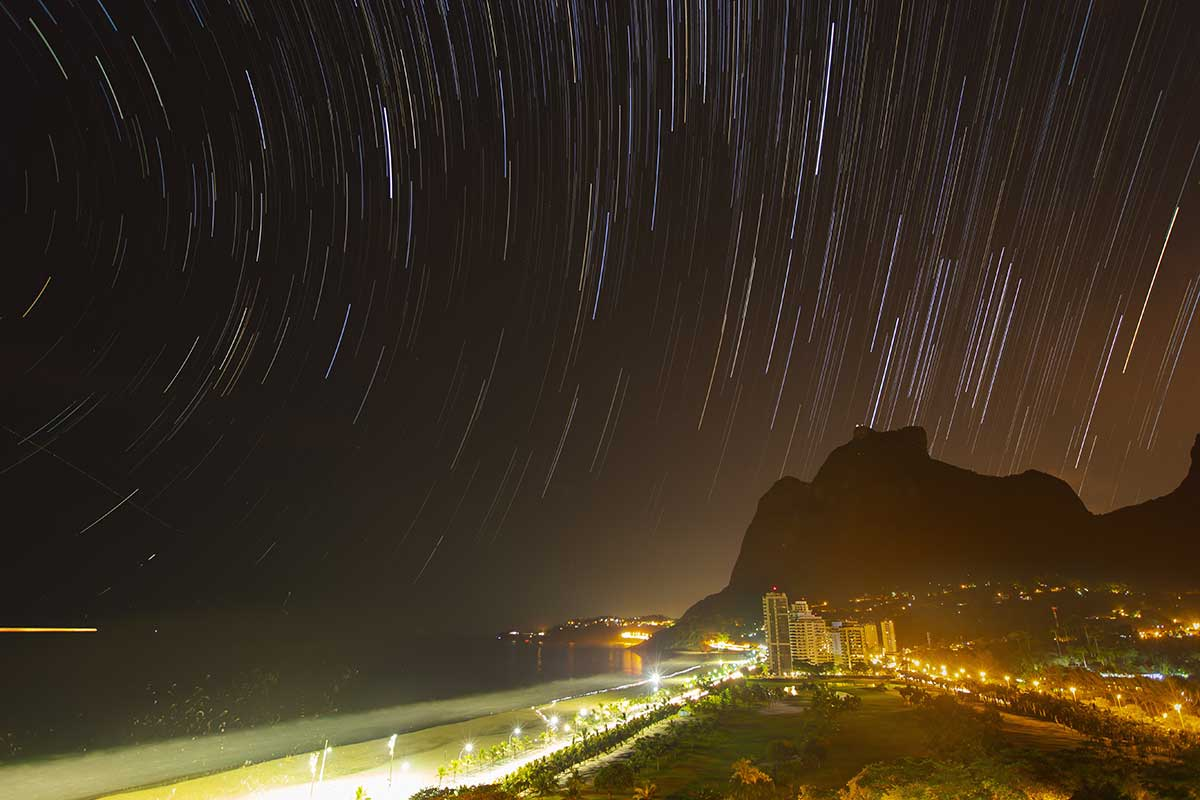
Brazil star trails and birds in light pollution in Rio beach at night

A 2009 study also suggests deleterious impacts on animals and ecosystems because of perturbation of polarized light or artificial polarization of light (even during the day, because direction of natural polarization of sun light and its reflection is a source of information for a lot of animals). This form of pollution is named polarized light pollution (PLP). Unnatural polarized light sources can trigger maladaptive behaviors in polarization-sensitive taxa and alter ecological interactions.

Lights on tall structures can disorient migrating birds. Estimates by the U.S. Fish and Wildlife Service of the number of birds killed after being attracted to tall towers range from four to five million per year to an order of magnitude higher. The Fatal Light Awareness Program (FLAP) works with building owners in Toronto, Ontario, Canada and other cities to reduce mortality of birds by turning out lights during migration periods. Another study has found that the lights produced by the Post Tower has affected 25 bird species. As a result, they discovered that decreasing the use of excessive lights increased the survival rate of bird species. Another study conducted at the Western Wall in Jerusalem found that the intense, 24-hour artificial lighting at the site disrupted the circadian rhythms of common swifts, causing them to become active at night—contrary to their natural diurnal behavior. The research revealed that the birds utilized the light to hunt insects attracted to the floodlights, effectively shifting their foraging and activity patterns to the nocturnal hours.

In Washington, D.C., the Lights Out DC program, run in partnership with City Wildlife, organizes volunteers during spring and fall migration to document bird–building collisions, transport injured birds to rehabilitation, and use the resulting data to advocate for bird-friendly lighting and glass treatments on buildings.

Similar disorientation has also been noted for bird species migrating close to offshore production and drilling facilities. Studies carried out by Nederlandse Aardolie Maatschappij b.v. (NAM) and Shell have led to the development and trial of new lighting technologies in the North Sea. In early 2007, the lights were installed on the Shell production platform L15. The experiment proved a great success since the number of birds circling the platform declined by 50 to 90%.

Island regions such as Hawaii and the Juan Fernández Archipelago are prime examples of seabird disruption due to nocturnal light pollution. Even lights lower to the ground, such as standard street lamps and residential lighting cause disorientation and result in injury, stranding/grounding, and death to many species of birds, including endangered species such as the Newell's shearwater. A number of programs are in place to help mitigate these effects, including dark sky programs aiming to filter and decrease light pollution in critical areas , and rescue programs to rehabilitate affected seabirds. The Pacific Missile Range Facility in Mana, which runs a Dark Skies program, has worked to spread awareness of the issue to residents and businesses in Kauai, encouraging responsible lighting practices to diminish light pollution as much as possible during critical fledgling seasons.

Birds migrate at night for several reasons. They save water from dehydration in hot day flying, and part of the bird's navigation system works with stars in some way. With city light outshining the night sky, birds (and also about mammals) no longer navigate by stars.

Sea turtle hatchlings emerging from nests on beaches are another casualty of light pollution. It is a common misconception that hatchling sea turtles are attracted to the moon. Rather, they find the ocean by moving away from the dark silhouette of dunes and their vegetation, a behavior with which artificial lights interfere. The breeding activity and reproductive phenology of toads, however, are cued by moonlight. Juvenile seabirds are also disoriented by lights as they leave their nests and fly out to sea, causing events of high mortality. Amphibians and reptiles are also affected by light pollution. Introduced light sources during normally dark periods can disrupt levels of melatonin production. Melatonin is a hormone that regulates photoperiodic physiology and behaviour. Some species of frogs and salamanders utilize a light-dependent "compass" to orient their migratory behaviour to breeding sites. Introduced light can also cause developmental irregularities, such as retinal damage, reduced juvenile growth, premature metamorphosis, reduced sperm production, and genetic mutation. Close to global coastal megacities (e.g. Tokyo, Shanghai), the natural illumination cycles provided by the moon in the marine environment are considerably disrupted by light pollution, with only nights around the full moon providing greater radiances, and over a given month lunar dosages may be a factor of 6 less than light pollution dosages.

In September 2009, the 9th European Dark-Sky Symposium in Armagh, Northern Ireland had a session on the environmental effects of light at night (LAN). It dealt with bats, turtles, the "hidden" harms of LAN, and many other topics. The environmental effects of LAN were mentioned as early as 1897, in a Los Angeles Times article. The following is an excerpt from that article, called "Electricity and English songbirds":

An English journal has become alarmed at the relation of electricity to songbirds, which it maintains is closer than that of cats and fodder crops. How many of us, it asks, foresee that electricity may extirpate the songbird? ... With the exception of the finches, all the English songbirds may be said to be insectivorous, and their diet consists chiefly of vast numbers of very small insects which they collect from the grass and herbs before the dew is dry. As the electric light is finding its way for street illumination into the country parts of England, these poor winged atoms are slain by thousands at each light every warm summer evening. ... The fear is expressed, that when England is lighted from one end to the other with electricity the songbirds will die out from the failure of their food supply.

=== Effect on astronomy ===
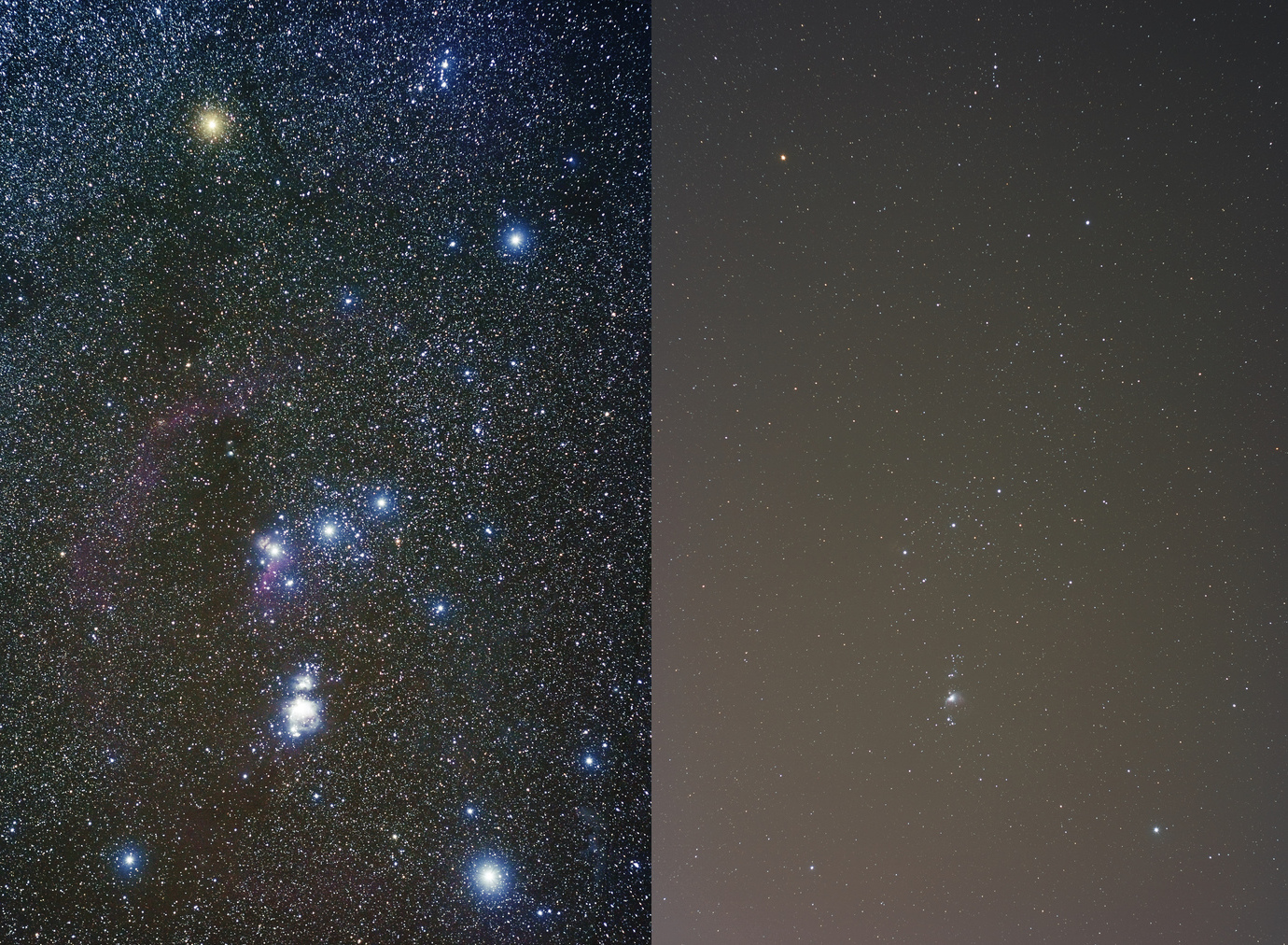
The constellation Orion, imaged at left from dark skies, and at right from within the Provo/Orem, Utah metropolitan area.

Astronomy is very sensitive to light pollution. The night sky viewed from a city bears no resemblance to what can be seen from dark skies. Skyglow (the scattering of light in the atmosphere at night) reduces the contrast between stars and galaxies and the sky itself, making it much harder to see fainter objects. This is one factor that has caused newer telescopes to be built in increasingly remote areas. Even at apparent clear night skies, there can be a lot of stray light that becomes visible at longer exposure times in astrophotography. By means of software, the stray light can be reduced, but at the same time, object detail could be lost in the image. The following picture of the area around the Pinwheel Galaxy (Messier 101) with the apparent magnitude of 7.5^{m} with all stars down to an apparent magnitude of 10^{m} was taken in Berlin in a direction close to the zenith with a fast lens (f-number 1.2) and an exposure time of five seconds at an exposure index of ISO 12800:

Pinwheel Galaxy in stray light

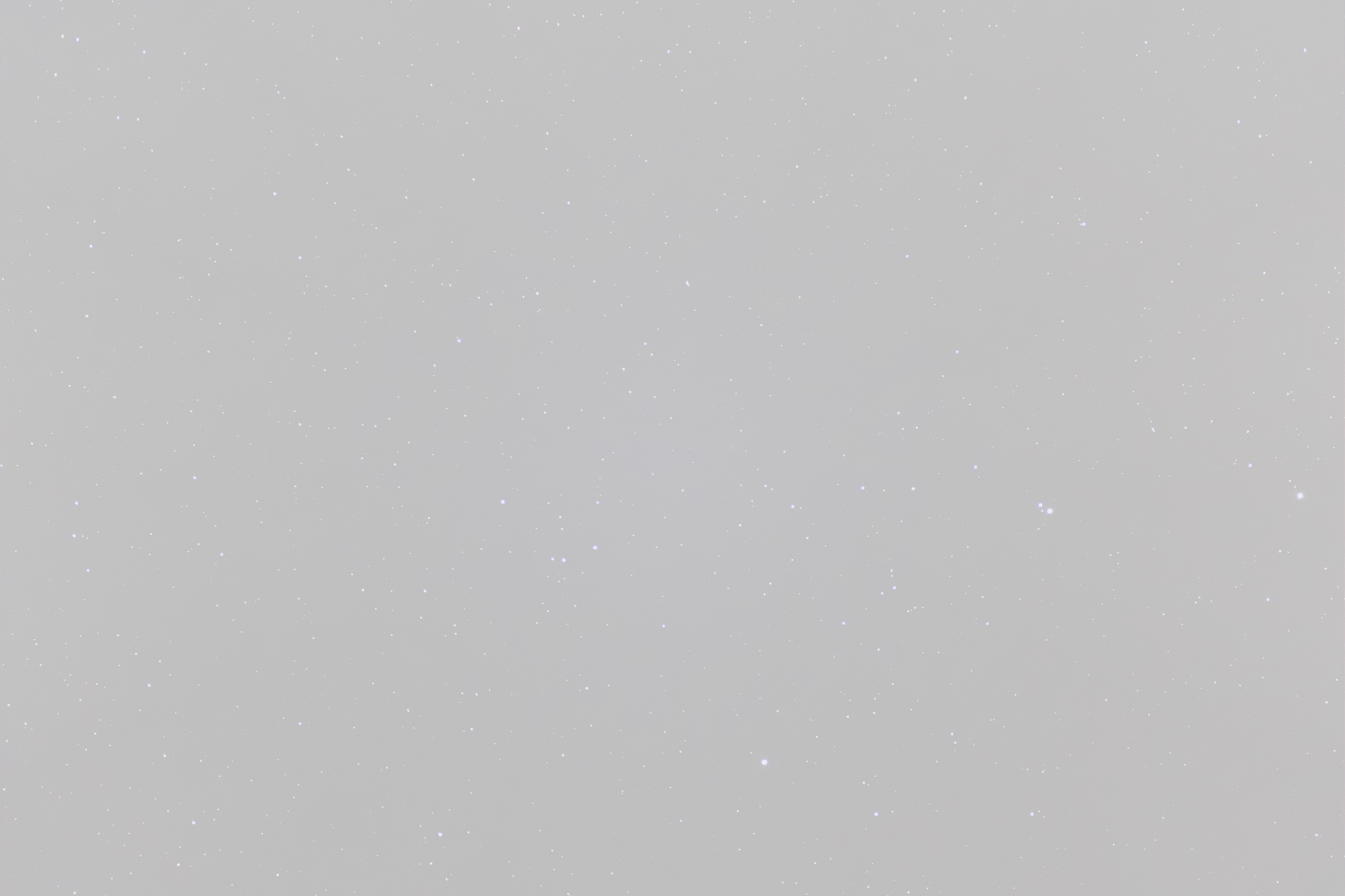
Original shot: lower edge Alkaid, right of center the double star Mizar with Alcor and right edge Alioth; the Pinwheel Galaxy is a small diffuse dot in the center of the image.

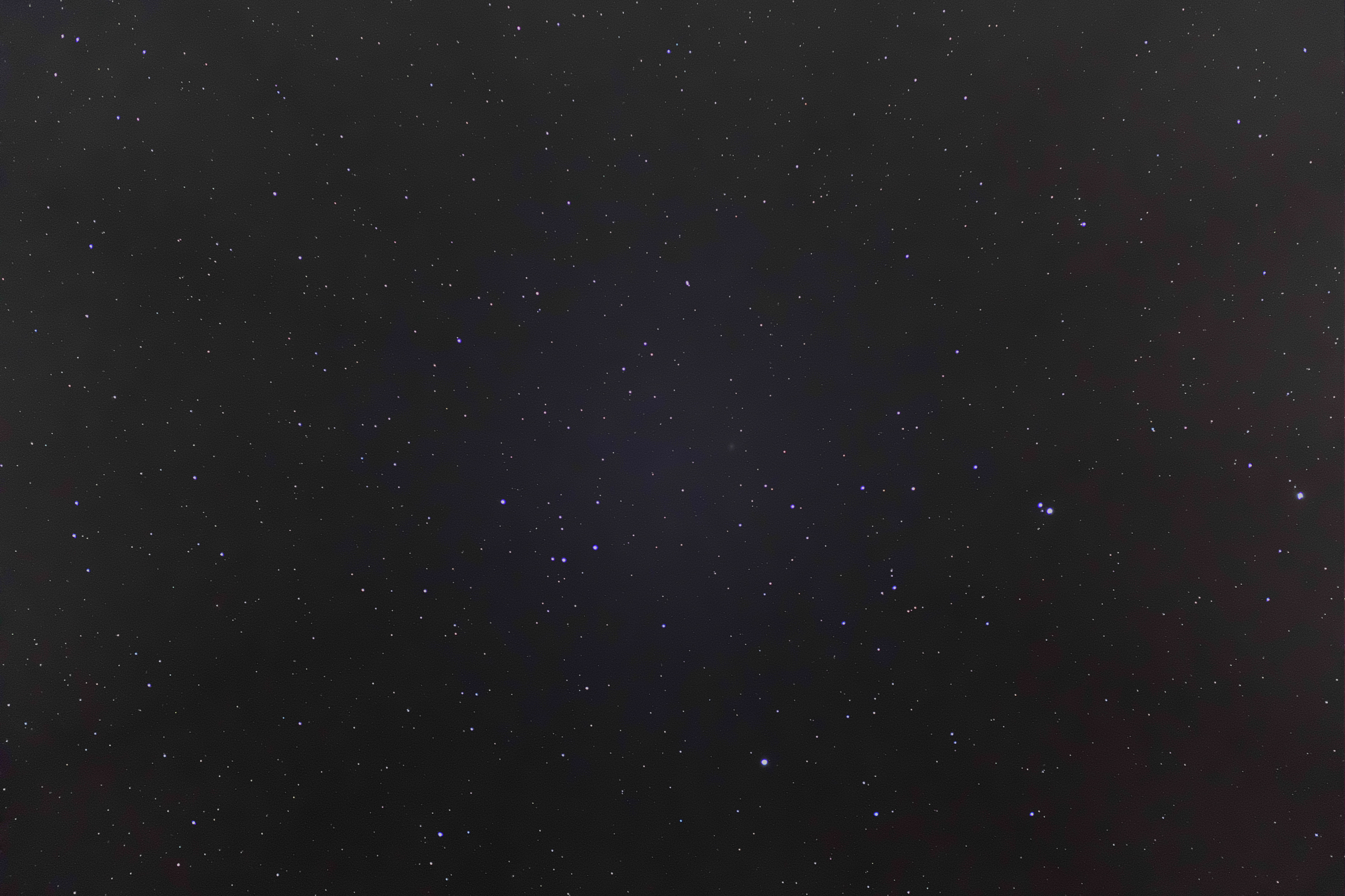
Black level compensation: the darkest point in the digital picture was set to zero luminance, in order to reduce the visible stray light. However, blue light caused by Rayleigh scattering is visible in the center of the image.

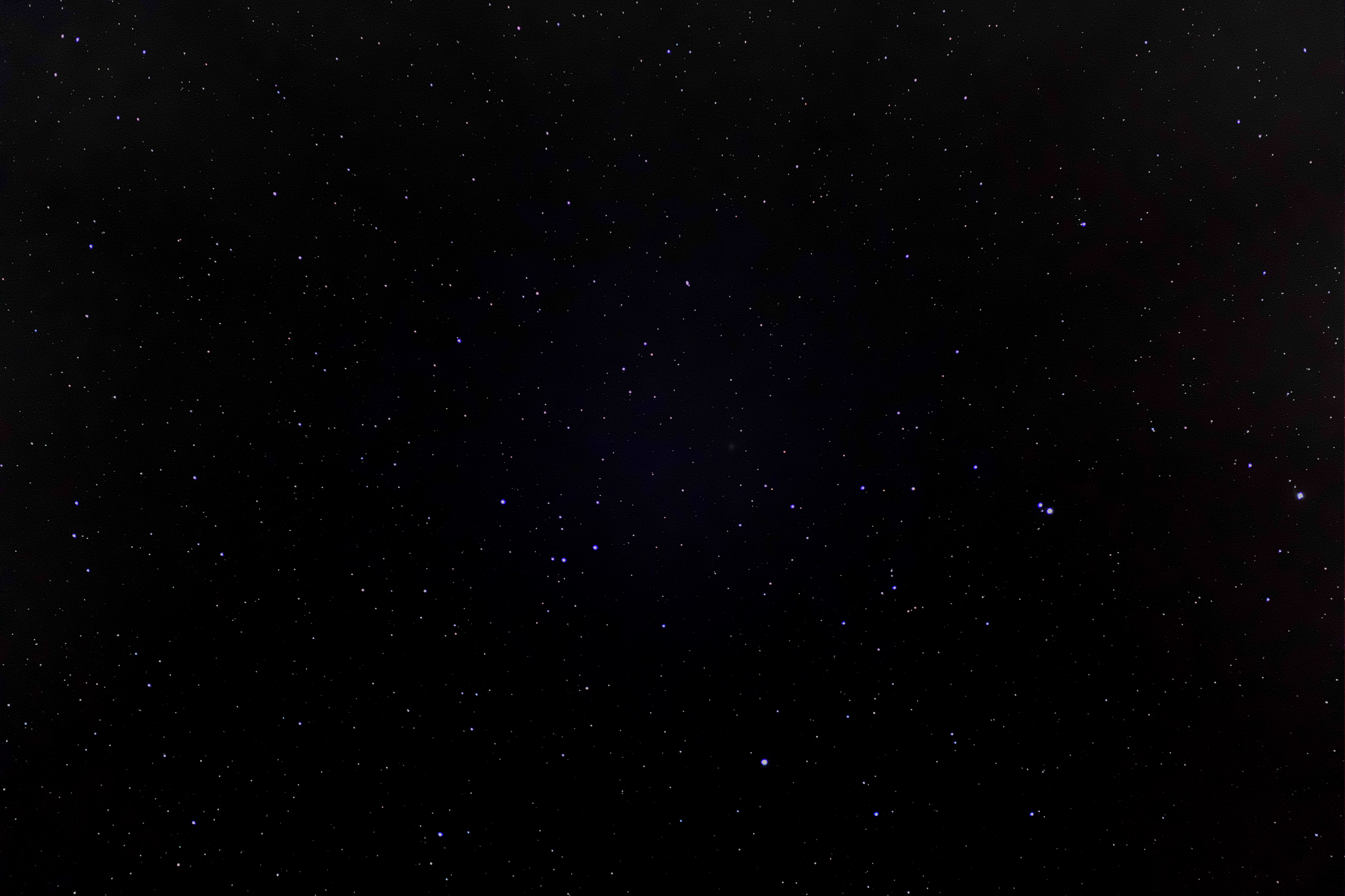
50 percent of stray light removed: the darker half of the stray light was set to zero luminance. The darker part of the blue light caused by Rayleigh scattering is still visible in the center of the image.

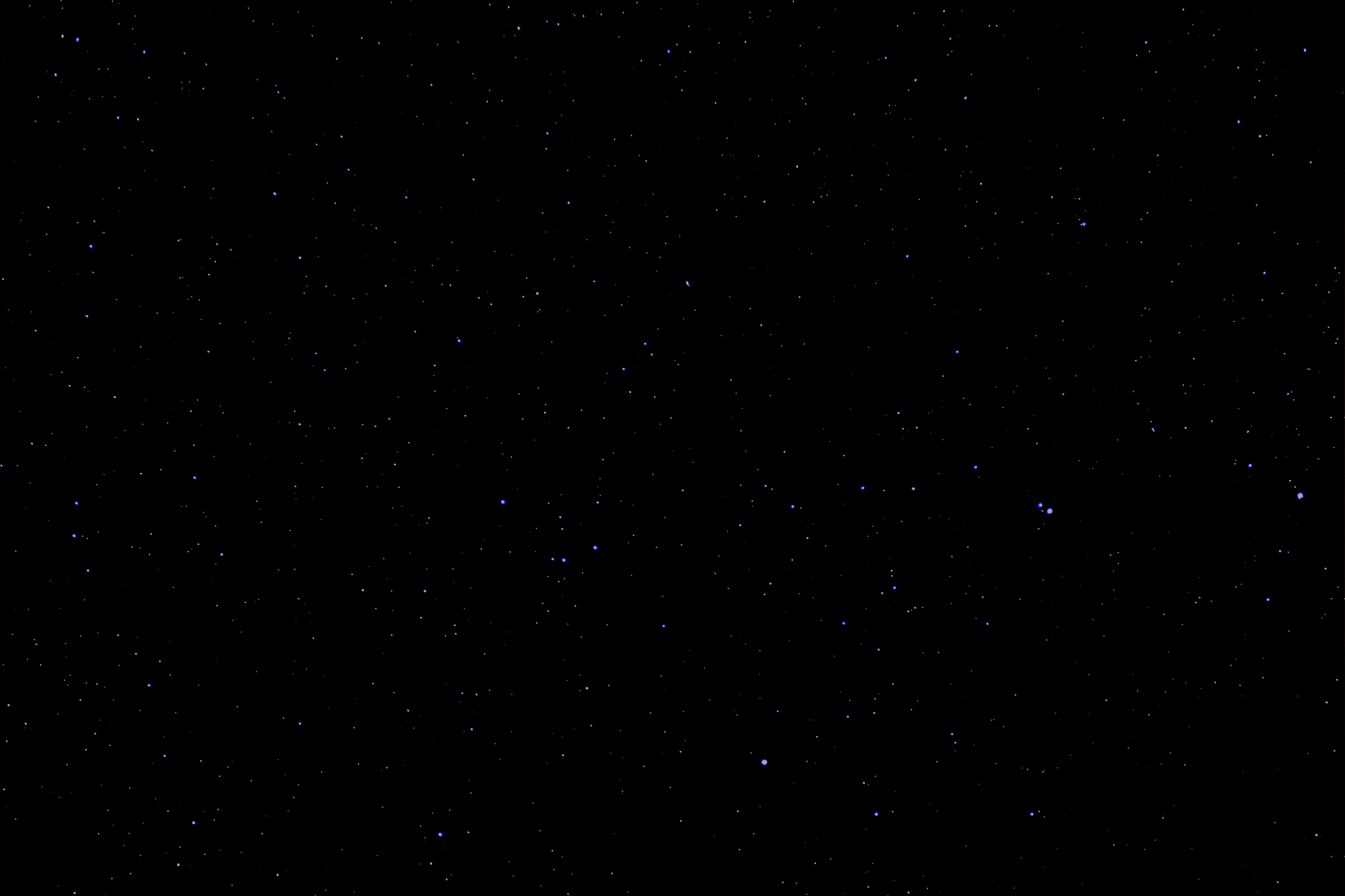
Complete elimination of stray light: all pixels showing stray light have been set to zero luminance, the faint and two-dimensional Pinwheel Galaxy is no longer visible, too.

Some astronomers use narrow-band "nebula filters", which allow only specific wavelengths of light commonly seen in nebulae, or broad-band "light pollution filters", which are designed to reduce (but not eliminate) the effects of light pollution by filtering out spectral lines commonly emitted by sodium- and mercury-vapor lamps, thus enhancing contrast and improving the view of dim objects such as galaxies and nebulae. Unfortunately, these light pollution reduction (LPR) filters are not a cure for light pollution. LPR filters reduce the brightness of the object under study and this limits the use of higher magnifications. LPR filters work by blocking light of certain wavelengths, which alters the color of the object, often creating a pronounced green cast. Furthermore, LPR filters work only on certain object types (mainly emission nebulae) and are of little use on galaxies and stars. No filter can match the effectiveness of a dark sky for visual or photographic purposes.

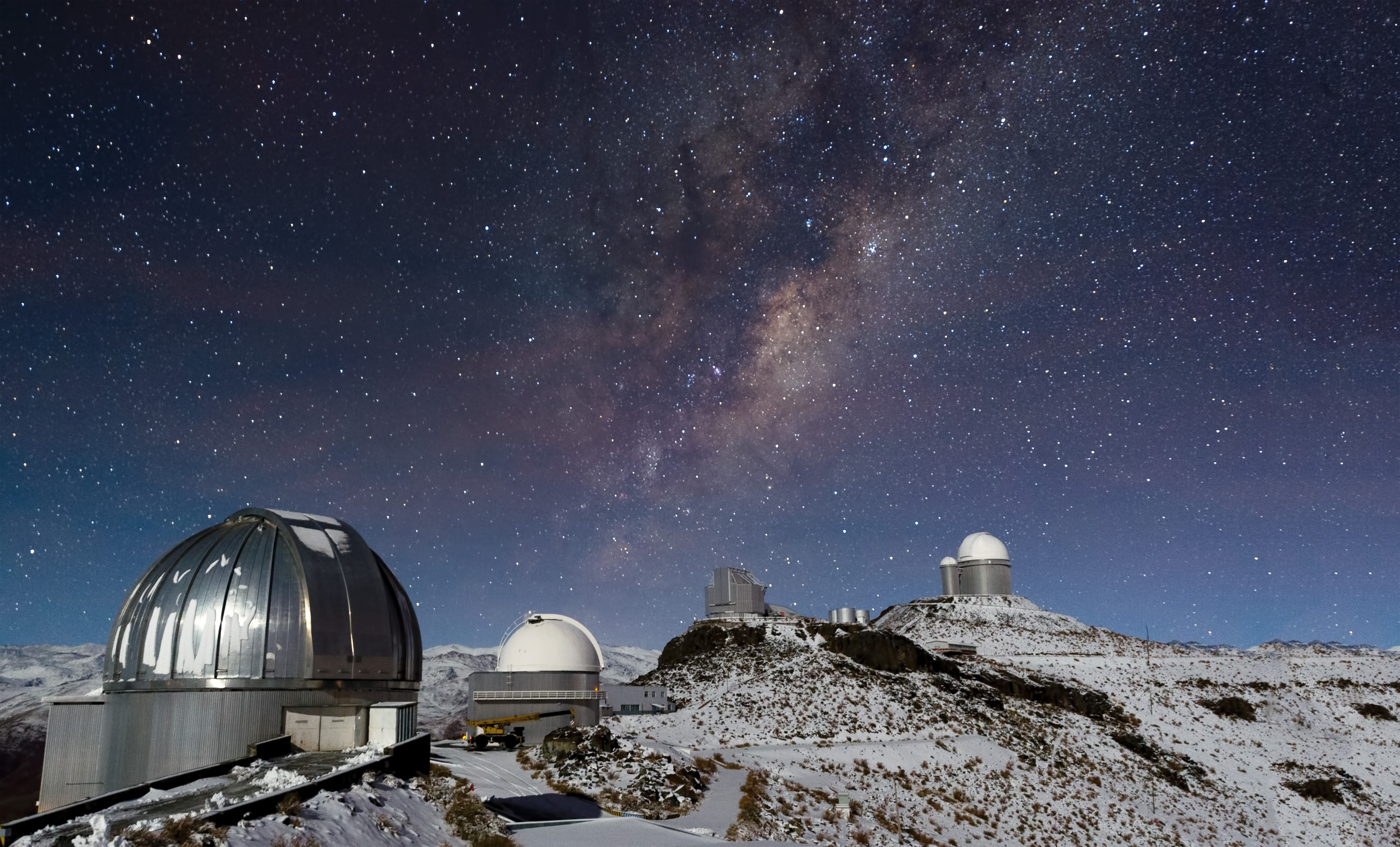
The Atacama Desert in northern Chile is far from any cities, and the night sky there is pitch-black. Photo by José Francisco Salgado.

Light pollution affects the visibility of diffuse sky objects like nebulae and galaxies more than stars, due to their low surface brightness. Most such objects are rendered invisible in heavily light-polluted skies above major cities. A simple method for estimating the darkness of a location is to look for the Milky Way, which from truly dark skies appears bright enough to cast a shadow.

In addition to skyglow, light trespass can impact observations when artificial light directly enters the tube of the telescope and is reflected from non-optical surfaces until it eventually reaches the eyepiece. This direct form of light pollution causes a glow across the field of view, which reduces contrast. Light trespass also makes it hard for a visual observer to become sufficiently adapted to the dark. The usual measures to reduce this glare, if reducing the light directly is not an option, include flocking the telescope tube and accessories to reduce reflection, and putting a light shield (also usable as a dew shield) on the telescope to reduce light entering from angles other than those near the target. Under these conditions, some astronomers prefer to observe under a black cloth to ensure maximum adaptation to the dark.

=== Increase in atmospheric pollution ===
A study presented at the American Geophysical Union meeting in San Francisco found that light pollution destroys nitrate radicals thus preventing the normal night time reduction of atmospheric smog produced by fumes emitted from cars and factories. The study was presented by Harald Stark from the National Oceanic and Atmospheric Administration.

=== Reduction of natural sky polarization ===
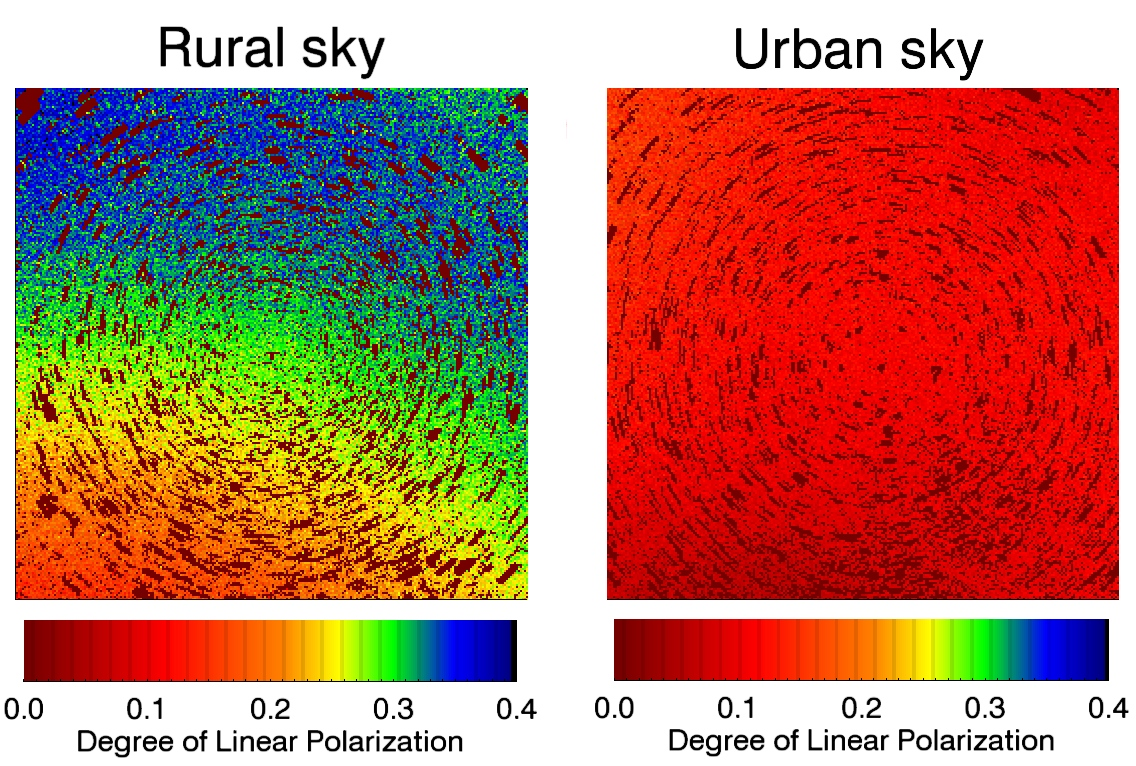
Light pollution is mostly unpolarized, and its addition to moonlight results in a decreased polarization signal.

In the night, the polarization of the moonlit sky is strongly reduced in the presence of urban light pollution, because scattered urban light is generally not strongly polarized, especially in urban areas. When the moon is not up, it is possible for the sky to become polarized to some degree, particularly in the case of strongly non-uniform light sources. The polarization pattern of the sky cannot be directly perceived by the human visual system, but is used by some animals for orientation and navigation.

=== Economic relation ===
It is not uncommon to find 24-hour business, such as gas stations, convenience stores, and pharmacies. Hospitals and other healthcare facilities must be staffed 24 hours per day, seven days per week. With the rise of Amazon, many factories and shipping companies now operate 24x7 shifts to keep up with the demand of the new global consumer. These industries all require light, both inside and outside their facilities to ensure the safety of their workers as they move about their jobs and when they enter and depart the facilities. As a result, "40% of the United States and almost 20% of the European Union population has lost the ability to view the night sky…in other words, it is as if they never really experience nighttime."

With a focus on shift work and the continued need for 24-hour operations of specific sectors of the economy, researchers are looking at the impact of light pollution on this group of workers. In 2007 the International Agency for Research on Cancer (IARC) sought to bring notice to the risk from shift work as a probable risk for developing cancers. This move was the result of numerous studies that found increased risks of cancers in groups of shift workers. The 1998 Nurses Health Study found a link between breast cancer and nurses who had worked rotating night shifts in their young adult life. However, it is not possible to halt shift work in these industries. Hospitals must be staffed around the clock.

Research suggests that, like other environmental issues, light pollution is primarily a problem caused by industrialized nations. Numerous economic indicators have been examined to get a better sense of where light pollution was occurring around the globe. Countries with paved roads, an indicator of developed infrastructure, often had increased light pollution. Similarly, countries with a high rate of resource extraction also have high rates of light pollution. Also those with the highest GDP and high surface area described as urban and suburban also had the highest rates of light pollution.

China is an emerging leader in industrial and economic growth. A recent study of light pollution using the Defense Meteorological Satellite Program Operational Linescan System (DMSL/OLS) found that light pollution is increasing over the eastern coastal cities but decreasing over the industrial and mineral extraction cities. Specifically, urban areas around the Yangtze River delta, Pearl River delta, and Beijing-Tianjin area are specific light pollution areas of concern. Examining China as a whole, it was found that light pollution in the East and North was much higher than the West. This is consistent with major industrial factories located in the East and North while resource extraction dominates the West.

In 2009, following the United Nations declaration of The Year of Astronomy, researchers urged a better understanding of artificial light and the role it plays in social, economic, and environmental issues. Continued unfettered use of artificial light in urban and rural areas would cause a global shift with unpredictable outcomes. Focusing on the economic impact of increased energy consumption in light bulbs, or the move to energy efficiency of lighting, is not enough. Rather, the broader focus should be on the socio-economic, ecologic, and physiologic impacts of light pollution.

Humans require some artificial night light for shift work, manufacturing, street safety, and nighttime driving and research has shown that artificial light disrupts the lives of animals. However, recent studies suggest that we may be able to find a happy medium. A 2021 article examined seasonal light changes and its effect on all animals, but specifically mollusks. The article claims that previous light research primarily focuses on length of exposure to light. However, further research should attempt to determine the safest amount of light exposure, in terms of duration and intensity, that would be most desirable for both humans and animals. With the development on this data, possible safety limits could be applied for light levels. Ideally, the light level would maintain human benefits, while also decreasing or fully removing the negative impacts on animals.

=== Noctalgia ===
Noctalgia is the feeling of loss of access to seeing a starry night sky. This also includes the feeling of "sky grief", where people no longer have the ability to look at the stars, something that has been done for most of human existence. The phenomenon also includes the grief over not being able to have the sense of awe and wonder that humans often experience when stargazing.

Coined by Aprana Venkatesan of the University of San Francisco and John Barentine, an astronomer, the term first appeared in August 2023 as a response to an article on the effects of light pollution published in the journal Science. Venkatesan and Barentine presented an all-encompassing definition that includes the loss of cultural identity and practices, such as storytelling and stargazing, as well as ancient knowledge such as celestial navigation. The authors argued that the night sky deserves a global protection scheme as an important part of the global heritage.

== Remediation ==
Energy conservation advocates contend that light pollution must be addressed by changing the habits of society, so that lighting is used more efficiently, with less waste and less creation of unwanted or unneeded illumination. Several industry groups also recognize light pollution as an important issue. For example, the Institution of Lighting Engineers in the United Kingdom provides its members with information about light pollution, the problems it causes, and how to reduce its impact. Research in 2017 suggested that energy efficiency may not be enough to reduce the light pollution because of the rebound effect.

Light levels can be quantified by field measurement or mathematical modeling, the results of which are typically rendered in isophote maps or light contour maps. To deal with light pollution, authorities have taken a variety of measures depending on the interests, beliefs, and understandings of the society involved. These measures range from doing nothing at all to implementing strict laws and regulations specifying how lights may be installed and used.

== Reduction ==
Reducing light pollution implies many things, such as reducing sky glow, reducing glare, reducing light trespass, and reducing clutter. The method for best reducing light pollution, therefore, depends on exactly what the problem is in any given instance. Possible solutions include:

- Utilizing light sources of minimum intensity necessary to accomplish the light's purpose.
- Turning lights off using a timer or occupancy sensor or manually when not needed. For example, wind turbines have blinking lights that warn aircraft, to prevent collisions. Residents living near windfarms, especially those in rural areas, have complained that the blinking lights are a bothersome form of light pollution. A light mitigation approach involves Aircraft Detection Lighting Systems (ADLSs) by which the lights are turned on, only when the ADLS's radar detects aircraft within thresholds of altitude and distance.
- Improving lighting fixtures, so they direct their light more accurately towards where it is needed, and with fewer side effects.
- Adjusting the type of lights used, so the light waves emitted are those that are less likely to cause severe light pollution problems. Mercury, metal halide and above all first generation of blue-light LED road luminaires are much more polluting than sodium lamps: Earth's atmosphere scatters and transmits blue light better than yellow or red light. It is a common experience observing "glare" and "fog" around and below LED road luminaires as soon as air humidity increases, while orange sodium lamp luminaires are less prone to showing this phenomenon.
- Evaluating existing lighting plans, and re-designing some or all the plans depending on whether existing light is actually needed.

=== Improving lighting fixtures ===
The use of full cutoff lighting fixtures, as much as possible, is advocated by most campaigners for the reduction of light pollution. It is also commonly recommended that lights be spaced appropriately for maximum efficiency, and that number of luminaires being used as well as the wattage of each luminaire match the needs of the particular application (based on local lighting design standards).

Full cutoff fixtures first became available in 1959 with the introduction of General Electric's M100 fixture.

A full cutoff fixture, when correctly installed, reduces the chance for light to escape above the plane of the horizontal. Light released above the horizontal may sometimes be lighting an intended target, but often serves no purpose. When it enters into the atmosphere, light contributes to sky glow. Some governments and organizations are now considering, or have already implemented, full cutoff fixtures in street lamps and stadium lighting.

The use of full cutoff fixtures helps to reduce sky glow by preventing light from escaping above the horizontal. Full cutoff typically reduces the visibility of the lamp and reflector within a luminaire, so the effects of glare are also reduced. Campaigners also commonly argue that full cutoff fixtures are more efficient than other fixtures, since light that would otherwise have escaped into the atmosphere may instead be directed towards the ground. However, full cutoff fixtures may also trap more light in the fixture than other types of luminaires, corresponding to lower luminaire efficiency, suggesting a re-design of some luminaires may be necessary.

The use of full cutoff fixtures can allow for lower wattage lamps to be used in the fixtures, producing the same or sometimes a better effect, due to being more carefully controlled. In every lighting system, some sky glow also results from light reflected from the ground. This reflection can be reduced, however, by being careful to use only the lowest wattage necessary for the lamp, and setting spacing between lights appropriately. Assuring luminaire setback is greater than 90° from highly reflective surfaces also diminishes reflectance.

A common criticism of full cutoff lighting fixtures is that they are sometimes not as aesthetically pleasing to look at. This is most likely because historically there has not been a large market specifically for full cutoff fixtures, and because people typically like to see the source of illumination. Due to the specificity with their direction of light, full cutoff fixtures sometimes also require expertise to install for maximum effect.

The effectiveness of using full cutoff roadway lights to combat light pollution has also been called into question. According to design investigations, luminaires with full cutoff distributions (as opposed to cutoff or semi cutoff, compared here) have to be closer together to meet the same light level, uniformity and glare requirements specified by the IESNA. These simulations optimized the height and spacing of the lights while constraining the overall design to meet the IESNA requirements, and then compared total uplight and energy consumption of different luminaire designs and powers. Cutoff designs performed better than full cutoff designs, and semi-cutoff performed better than either cutoff or full cutoff. This indicates that, in roadway installations, over-illumination or poor uniformity produced by full cutoff fixtures may be more detrimental than direct uplight created by fewer cutoff or semi-cutoff fixtures. Therefore, the overall performance of existing systems could be improved more by reducing the number of luminaires than by switching to full cutoff designs.

However, using the definition of "light pollution" from some Italian regional bills (i.e., "every irradiance of artificial light outside competence areas and particularly upward the sky") only full cutoff design prevents light pollution. The Italian Lombardy region, where only full cutoff design is allowed (Lombardy act no. 17/2000, promoted by Cielobuio-coordination for the protection of the night sky), in 2007 had the lowest per capita energy consumption for public lighting in Italy. The same legislation also imposes a minimum distance between street lamps of about four times their height, so full cut-off street lamps are the best solution to reduce both light pollution and electrical power usage.

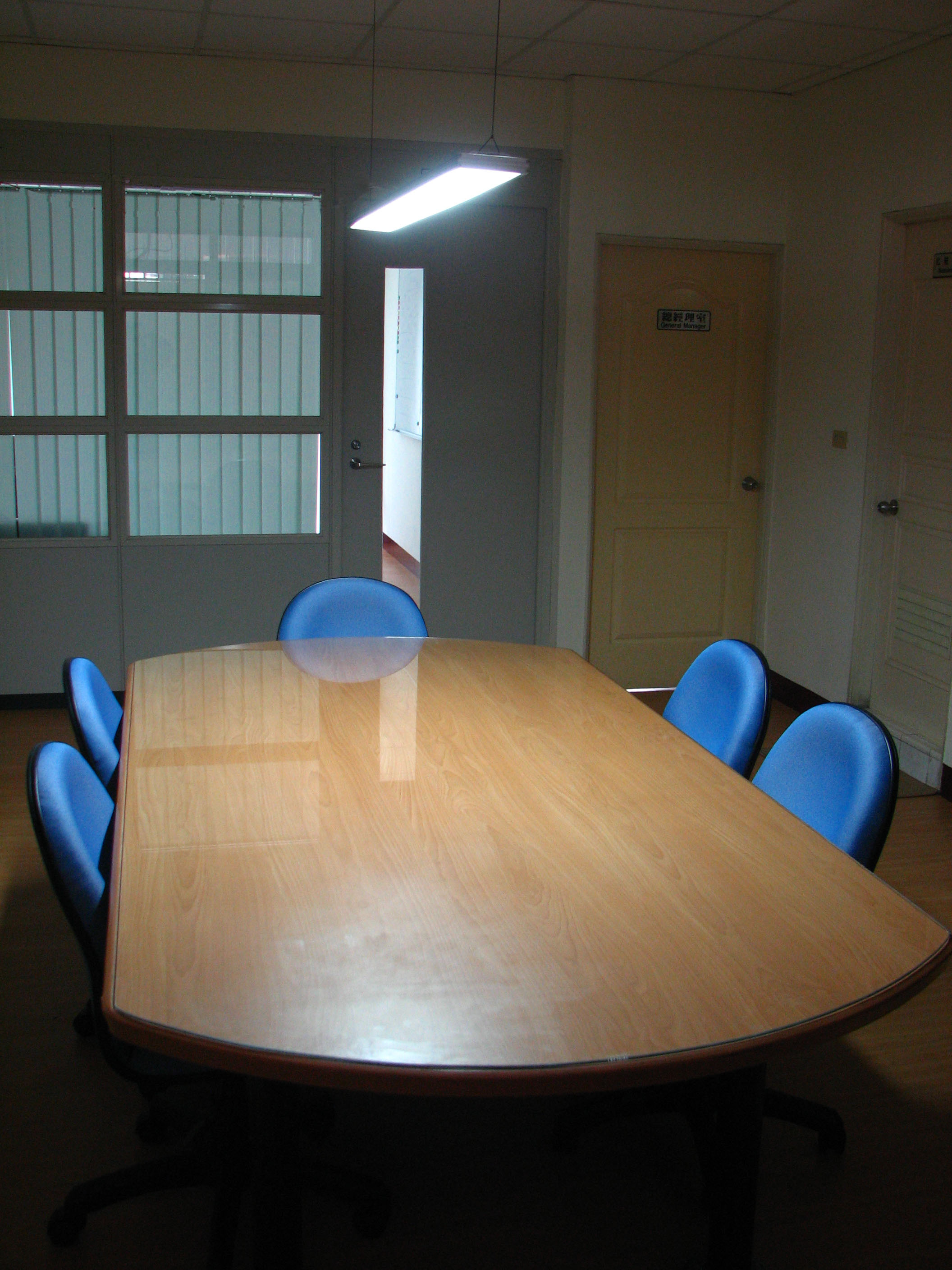
This kind of LED droplight could reduce unnecessary light pollution in building interiors.

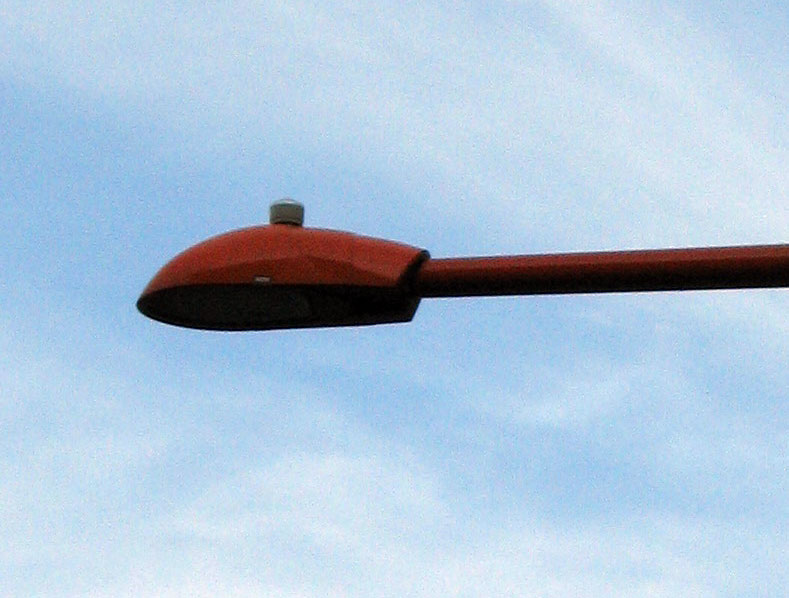
A flat-lens cobra luminaire, which is a full-cutoff fixture, is very effective in reducing light pollution. It ensures that light is directed only below the horizontal, which means less light is wasted by directing it outwards and upwards.

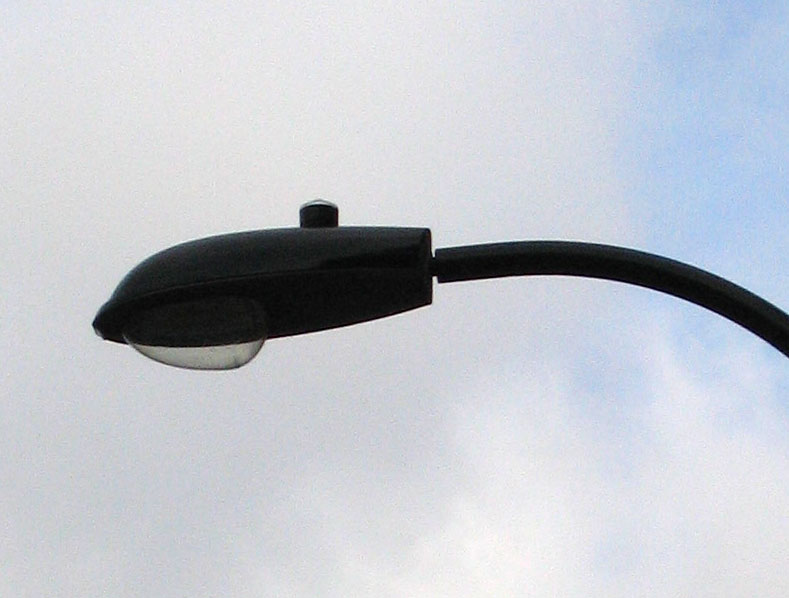
This drop-lens cobra luminaire allows light to escape sideways and upwards, where it may cause problems.

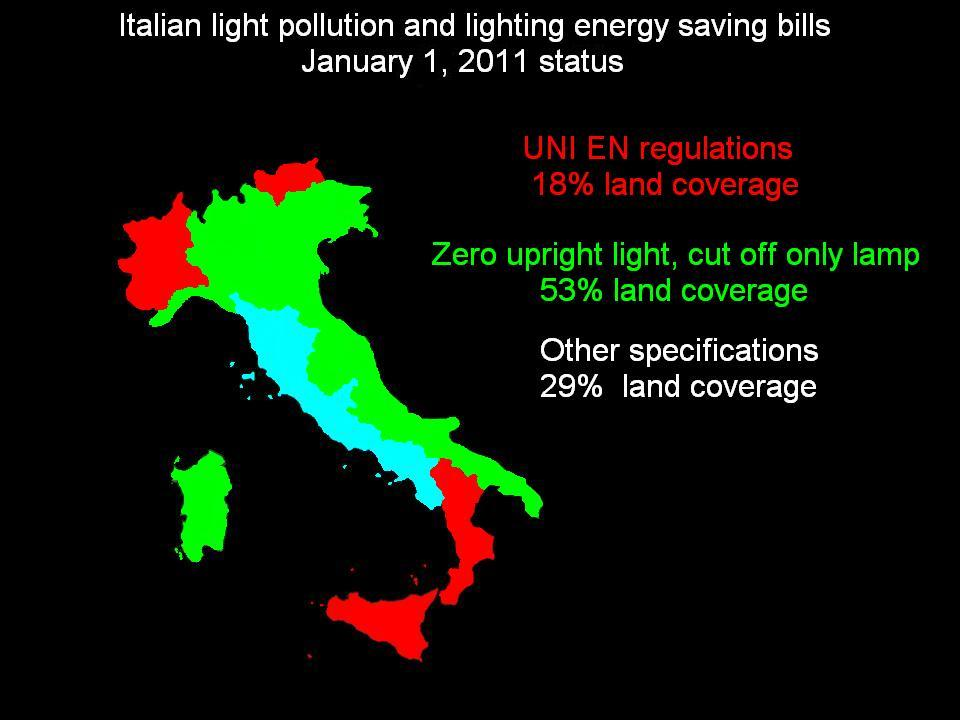
The majority of Italian regions require "zero upward light", which usually implies the use of overall full cut-off lamps for new luminaires, but violations are common.

=== Adjusting types of light sources ===
Several different types of light sources exist, each having a variety of properties that determine their appropriateness for different tasks. Particularly notable characteristics are efficiency and spectral power distribution. It is often the case that inappropriate light sources have been selected for a task, either due to ignorance or because more appropriate lighting technology was unavailable at the time of installation. Therefore, poorly chosen light sources often contribute unnecessarily to light pollution and energy waste. By updating light sources appropriately, it is often possible to reduce energy use and pollutive effects while simultaneously improving efficiency and visibility.

Some types of light sources are listed in order of energy efficiency in the table below (figures are approximate maintained values), and include their visual skyglow impact, relative to LPS lighting.

Type of light source	Color	Luminous efficiency (in lumens per watt)	Sky glow impact (relative to LPS)
LED street light (white)	warm-white to cool-white	120	4–8
Low Pressure Sodium (LPS/SOX)	yellow/amber	110	1.0
High Pressure Sodium (HPS/SON)	pink/amber-white	90	2.4
Metal Halide	warm-white to cool-white	70	4–8
Incandescent	yellow/white	8–25	1.1
PCA-LED	amber		2.4

Many astronomers request that nearby communities use low-pressure sodium lights or amber Aluminium gallium indium phosphide LED as much as possible because the principal wavelength emitted is comparably easy to work around or in rare cases filter out. The low cost of operating sodium lights is another feature. In 1980, for example, San Jose, California, replaced all street lamps with low pressure sodium lamps, whose light is easier for nearby Lick Observatory to filter out. Similar programs are now in place in Arizona and Hawaii. Such yellow light sources also have significantly less visual skyglow impact, so reduce visual sky brightness and improve star visibility for everyone.

Disadvantages of low-pressure sodium lighting are that fixtures must usually be larger than competing fixtures, and that color cannot be distinguished, due to its emitting principally a single wavelength of light (see security lighting). Due to the substantial size of the lamp, particularly in higher wattages such as 135 W and 180 W, control of light emissions from low-pressure sodium luminaires is more difficult. For applications requiring more precise direction of light (such as narrow roadways) the native lamp efficacy advantage of this lamp type is decreased and may be entirely lost compared to high pressure sodium lamps. Allegations that this also leads to higher amounts of light pollution from luminaires running these lamps arise principally because of older luminaires with poor shielding, still widely in use in the UK and in some other locations. Modern low-pressure sodium fixtures with better optics and full shielding, and the decreased skyglow impacts of yellow light preserve the luminous efficacy advantage of low-pressure sodium and result in most cases is less energy consumption and less visible light pollution. Unfortunately, due to continued lack of accurate information, many lighting professionals continue to disparage low-pressure sodium, contributing to its decreased acceptance and specification in lighting standards and therefore its use. According to Narisada and Schrueder (2004), another disadvantage of low-pressure sodium lamps is that some research has found that many people find the characteristic yellow light to be less pleasing aesthetically, although they caution that this research isn't thorough enough to draw conclusions from.

Because of the increased sensitivity of the human eye to blue and green wavelengths when viewing low-luminances (the Purkinje effect) in the night sky, different sources produce dramatically different amounts of visible skyglow from the same amount of light sent into the atmosphere. To reduce light pollution caused by blue light, it is necessary to adopt lamps that, while maintaining the same photopic luminous flux, produce minimal scotopic light, and at the same time establish specific restrictions on the emitted wavelengths, particularly by shifting the spectral flux towards the blue side of the scotopic band (below 440 nm), to protect star visibility and significantly reduce the impact of artificial night sky glow.

The protected wavelength range, the "P-band", should focus between 440 and 540 nm to preserve star visibility and reduce light pollution in wavelengths harmful to scotopic vision, while using lamps that emit less light in this range can help minimize pollution without compromising star visibility and protect health and the environment.

=== Re-designing lighting plans ===
In some cases, evaluation of existing plans has determined that more efficient lighting plans are possible. For instance, light pollution can be reduced by turning off unneeded outdoor lights, and lighting stadiums only when there are people inside. Timers are especially valuable for this purpose. One of the world's first coordinated legislative efforts to reduce the adverse effect of this pollution on the environment began in Flagstaff, Arizona, in the U.S. There, more than three decades of ordinance development has taken place, with the full support of the population, often with government support, with community advocates, and with the help of major local observatories, including the United States Naval Observatory Flagstaff Station. Each component helps to educate, protect and enforce the imperatives to intelligently reduce detrimental light pollution.

One example of a lighting plan assessment can be seen in a report originally commissioned by the Office of the Deputy Prime Minister in the United Kingdom, and now available through the Department for Communities and Local Government. The report details a plan to be implemented throughout the UK, for designing lighting schemes in the countryside, with a particular focus on preserving the environment.

In another example, the city of Calgary has recently replaced most residential street lights with models that are comparably energy efficient. The motivation is primarily operation cost and environmental conservation. The costs of installation are expected to be regained through energy savings within six to seven years.

The Swiss Agency for Energy Efficiency (SAFE) uses a concept that promises to be of great use in the diagnosis and design of road lighting, "consommation électrique spécifique (CES)", which can be translated into English as "specific electric power consumption (SEC)". Thus, based on observed lighting levels in a wide range of Swiss towns, SAFE has defined target values for electric power consumption per metre for roads of various categories. Thus, SAFE currently recommends an SEC of two to three watts per meter for roads less than ten metres wide (four to six for wider roads). Such a measure provides an easily applicable environmental protection constraint on conventional "norms", which usually are based on the recommendations of lighting manufacturing interests, who may not take into account environmental criteria. In view of ongoing progress in lighting technology, target SEC values will need to be periodically revised downwards.

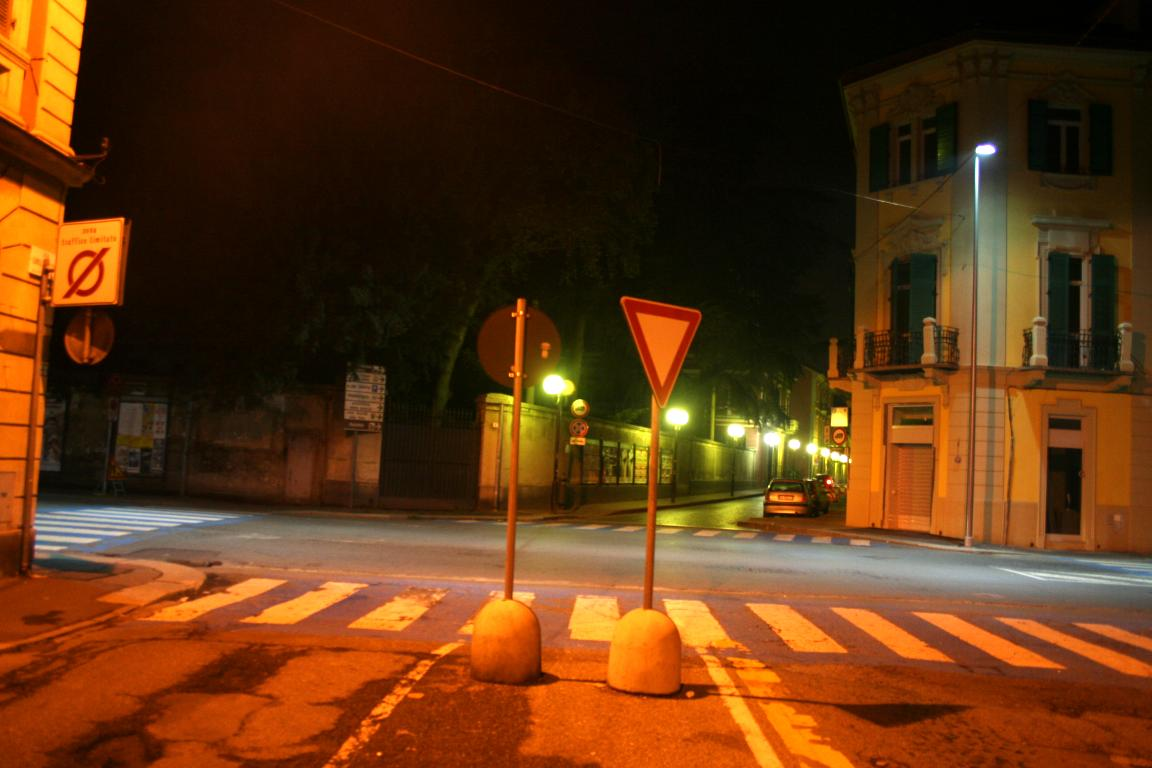
Crossroad in Alessandria, Italy: luminaires with mercury lamps are in the background, LED street lights in the middle, luminaires with high pressure sodium lamps are in the foreground.

A newer method for predicting and measuring various aspects of light pollution was described in the journal Lighting Research & Technology (September 2008). Scientists at Rensselaer Polytechnic Institute's Lighting Research Center have developed a comprehensive method called Outdoor Site-Lighting Performance (OSP), which allows users to quantify, and thus optimize, the performance of existing and planned lighting designs and applications to minimize excessive or obtrusive light leaving the boundaries of a property. OSP can be used by lighting engineers immediately, particularly for the investigation of glow and trespass (glare analyses are more complex to perform and current commercial software does not readily allow them), and can help users compare several lighting design alternatives for the same site.

In the effort to reduce light pollution, researchers have developed a "Unified System of Photometry", which is a way to measure how much or what kind of street lighting is needed. The Unified System of Photometry allows light fixtures to be designed to reduce energy use while maintaining or improving perceptions of visibility, safety, and security. There was a need to create a new system of light measurement at night because the biological way in which the eye's rods and cones process light is different in nighttime conditions versus daytime conditions. Using this new system of photometry, results from recent studies have indicated that replacing traditional, yellowish, high-pressure sodium (HPS) lights with "cool" white light sources, such as induction, fluorescent, ceramic metal halide, or LEDs can actually reduce the amount of electric power used for lighting while maintaining or improving visibility in nighttime conditions.

The International Commission on Illumination, also known as the CIE from its French title, la Commission Internationale de l'Eclairage, will soon be releasing its own form of unified photometry for outdoor lighting.

=== Dark sky reserves ===
In 2001 International Dark Sky Places Program was founded in order to encourage communities, parks and protected areas around the world to preserve and protect dark sites through responsible lighting policies and public education. As of January 2022, there are 195 certified International Dark Sky Places in the world. For example, in 2016 China launched its first dark sky reserve in the Tibet Autonomous Region's Ngari Prefecture which covers an area of 2,500 square kilometers. Such areas are important for astronomical observation.

=== Community involvement ===
Increased awareness of the effects of artificial lighting could result in legislation to effectively mitigate it. However, some communities may hold back due to factors such as cultural beliefs; in some cultures around the world, darkness may be associated with evil, whereas light would be associated with progress by contrast. Furthermore, societal standards have made humans more active during the day time. However, more recent studies indicate that public awareness of the issue has increased and that more people are experiencing consequences of excessive artificial lighting. An assessment from 2020 shows an increase in citizen awareness in the late 20th century due to the availability of internet search engines and the ability to engage globally. The assessment discussion suggests that better information accessibility and voting may promote understanding and concern about the issue.

=== Dark infrastructure ===
Dark infrastructure is the creation and preservation of networks of natural levels of darkness, in an attempt to mitigate and reduce the adverse effects of artificial light on biodiversity. Implementation includes identifying and preserving existing dark networks as well as reducing artificial light at night.

== Gallery ==
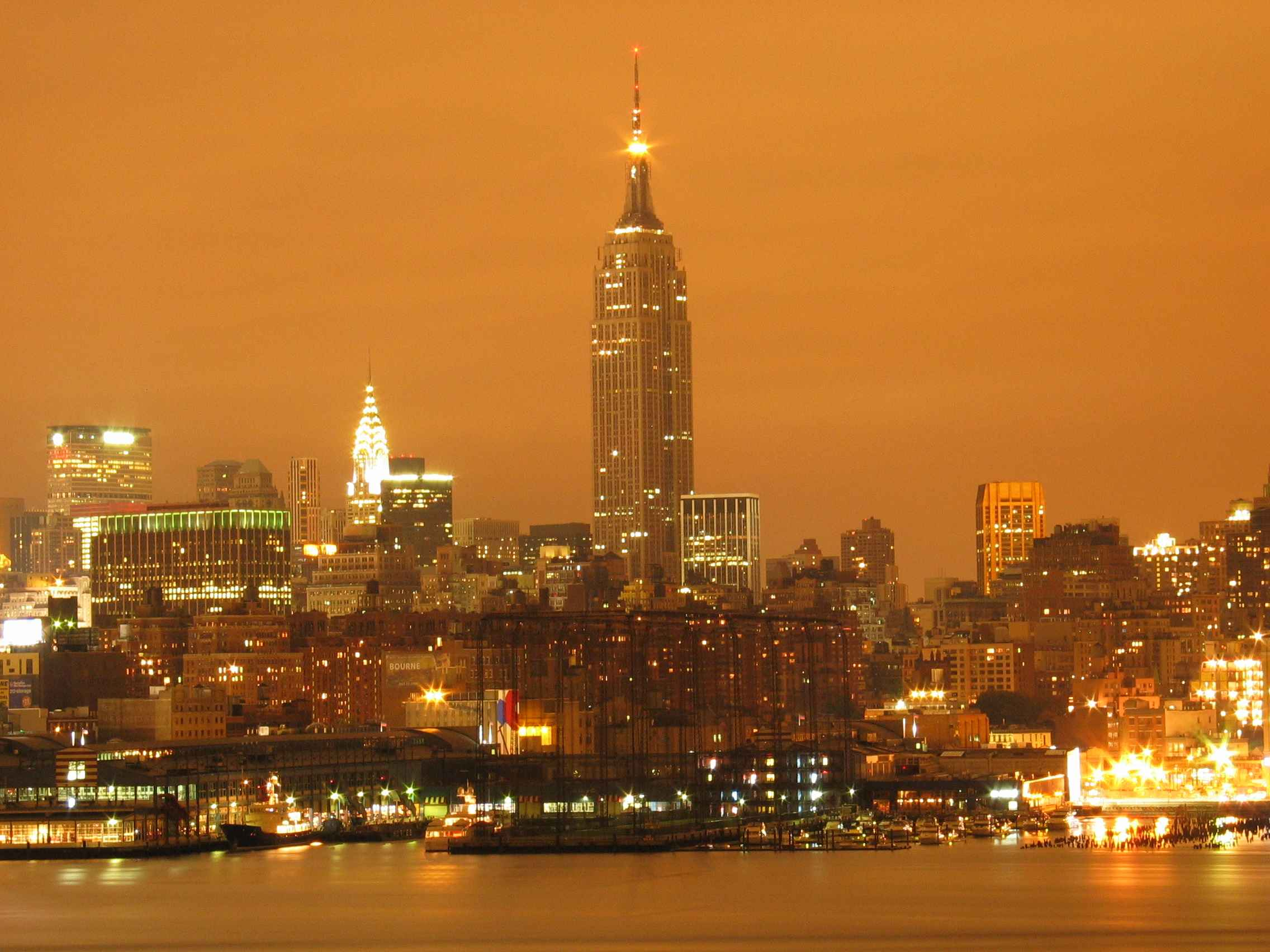
This time exposure photo of New York City at night shows skyglow.

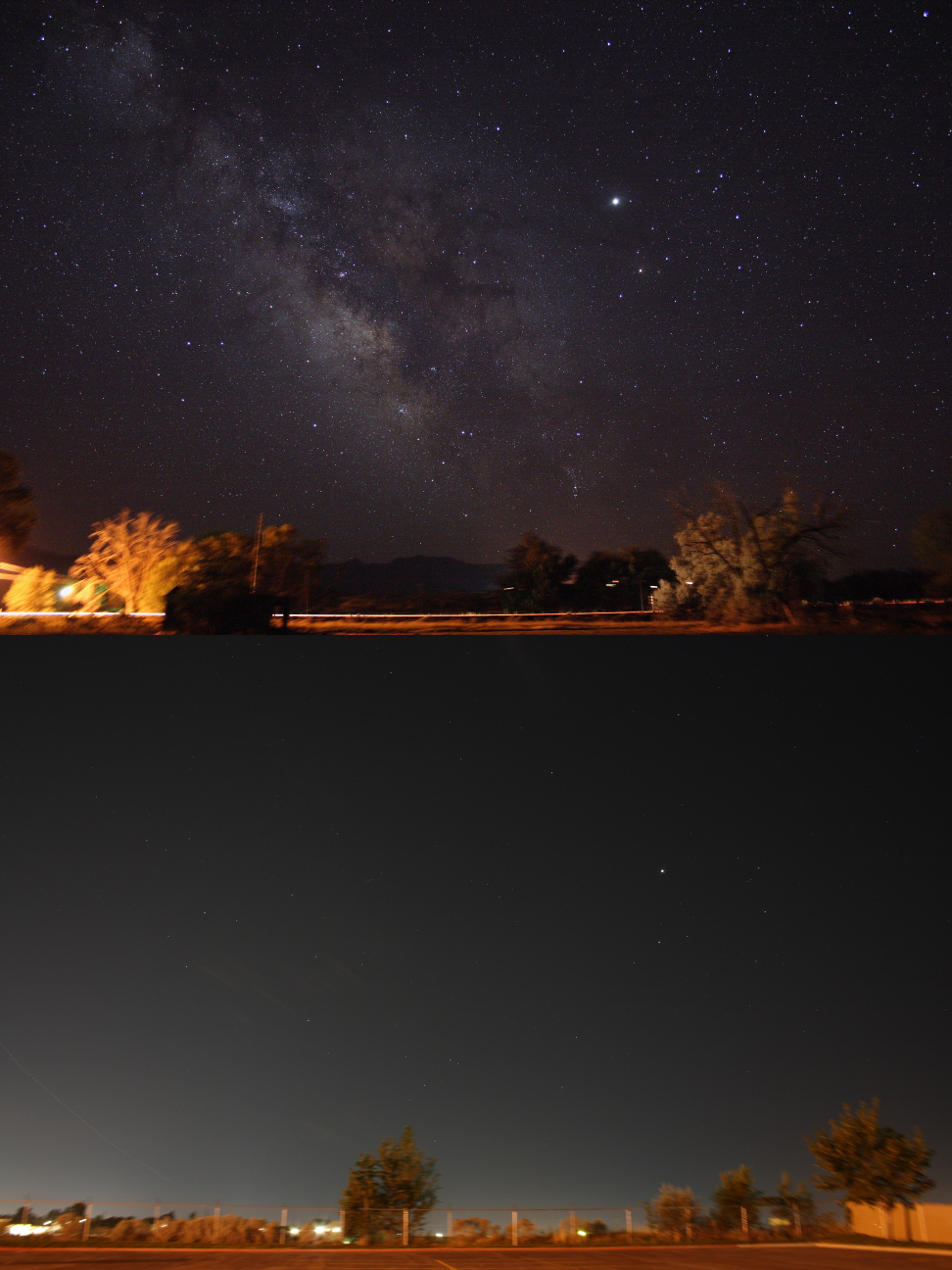
A comparison of the view of the night sky from a small rural town (top) and a metropolitan area (bottom). Light pollution dramatically reduces the visibility of stars.

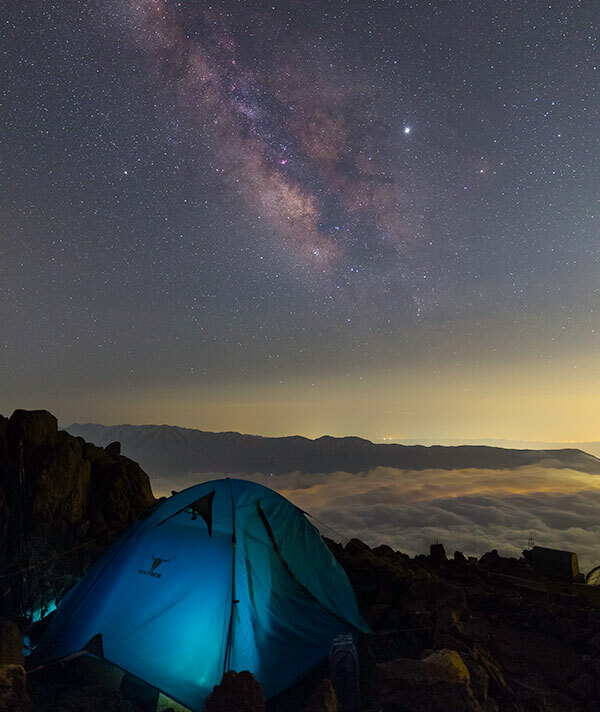
Impact of light pollution on a starry night, as seen from a 4200 m altitude on Mount Damavand in Iran.

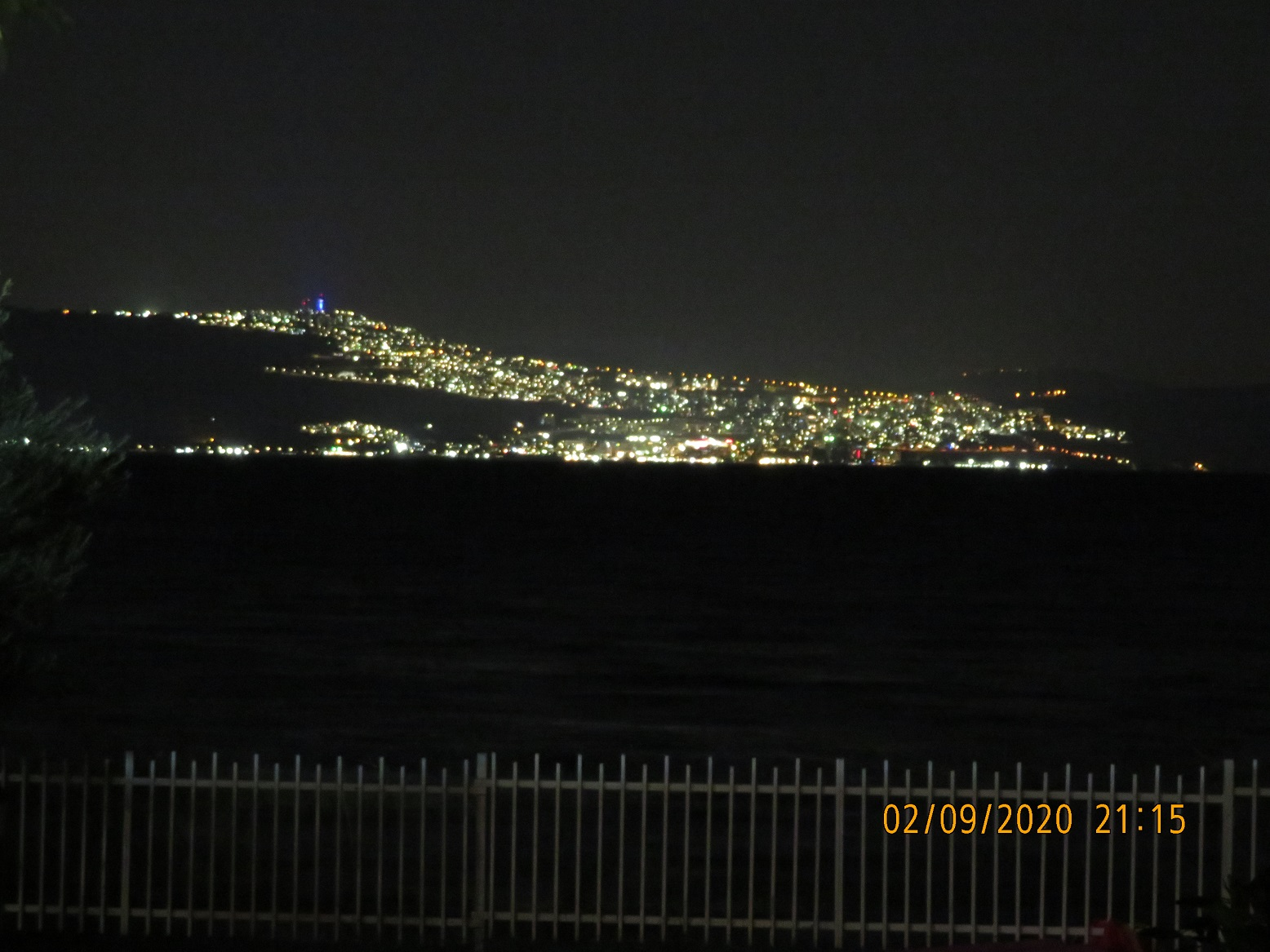
Impact of LED lighting on skyglow at night, as seen at Tiberias, Israel. Before the move to LED lighting in 2017, there was very little skyglow above the city.

== IUCN report ==
In the 2024 report "The World at Night: Preserving Natural Darkness for Heritage Conservation and Night Sky Appreciation" by the International Union for Conservation of Nature, light pollution is scrutinized for its contribution to energy waste and climate change and its detrimental effects on ecosystems, human sleep patterns, and traditions such as those of the Māori with regard to the Pleiades. The report proposes targeted mitigation strategies such as educational campaigns, legislative action, the implementation of dark sky-compliant lighting, and the promotion of certification programs to encourage better lighting practices and astrotourism.

== See also ==
- Roy Henry Garstang
- Further examples of affected species
Concepts
- Dark-sky preserve
- Environmental hazard
- Floodlight
- Flicker vertigo
- Lighting
- Photosensitive epilepsy
- Polarized light pollution
- Scotobiology

Events

- Earth Hour
- International Dark Sky Week

Organisations

- Commission for Dark Skies (CfDS)
- DarkSky International
- SKYGLOW

Other pollution

- Noise pollution

Geographical locations

- History of street lighting in the United States
- Light pollution in Hong Kong

Literature

- The End of Night (book)
- Tribute in Light

Wikiversity

- Lighting ordinance
