= Bogaert =

Surname list

Bogaert is a Dutch toponymic surname. Bogaert and other spellings, like Bogaard, Bogaardt, Boogaard, Boogaart, and Boomgaert are archaic or regional spellings of boomgaard, meaning "orchard" (possibly indicating a fruit grower). Since the standardization of surnames in the Netherlands, Bogaert as a surname occurs primarily in Belgium; in particular West and East Flanders. People with this surname include:

== Bogaert ==
- Annelies Bogaert (born 1949), Dutch politician
- Anthony Bogaert (born 1963), Canadian psychologist
- Cesar Bogaert (1910–1988), Dutch road racing cyclist
- Gaston Bogaert (1918–2008), Belgian painter
- Hendrick Bogaert (1630–1675), Dutch Golden Age painter
- Hendrik Bogaert (born 1968), Flemish politician
- Henri Bogaert (born 1948), Belgian economist
- Jan Bogaert (1957–2024), Belgian road racing cyclist
- Jo Bogaert (born c. 1970), Belgian house/techno musician
- Joseph Bogaert (1752–1820), Flemish publisher and rhetorician
- Julien Bogaert (1924–2018), Belgian sprint canoer
- Lorenz Bogaert (born 1976), Belgian online media entrepreneur
- Lou Bogaert (born 2004), French footballer
- Lucienne Bogaert (1892–1983), French actress
- Nashla Bogaert (born 1986), Dominican actress
- Philippe Bogaert (born 1971), Belgian television producer
- Teunis Gysbertse Bogaert (1625–1699), ancestor of Humphrey Bogart (1899–1957), government official, husband of Sarah Rapelje of New Netherland
- Thierry Bogaert, Belgian molecular biologist and businessman

== Bogaerts ==
- Annemie Bogaerts (born 1971), Belgian chemist
- Jean Bogaerts (1925–2017), Belgian road racing cyclist
- Marc Bogaerts (born 1951), Belgian choreographer and artistic director
- Romain Bogaerts (born 1993), Belgian tennis player
- Xander Bogaerts (born 1992), Aruban baseball player

== Van Bogaert ==
- Clément Van Bogaert (1865–1937), Belgian engineer and constructor

== Van den/der Bogaert ==
- Bryan Van Den Bogaert (born 1991), Belgian footballer
- Jeroen Van den Bogaert (born 1979), Belgian alpine skier
- Martin van der Bogaert (1637–1694), Dutch-born French sculptor

== Van den Bogaerde ==
- Derek Niven van den Bogaerde (1921–1999), English actor and novelist (a.k.a. "Sir Dirk Bogarde")
- Jasmine van den Bogaerde (born 1996), English musician, songwriter and singer (a.k.a. "Birdy")

== See also ==
- Bogert
- Bogart
- Bogarde
- Boogaard
- Van den Boogaard
- Baumgart
- Baumgartner
- Bogard
