= Bogart (surname) =

Bogart is a surname, derived from the Dutch surname "Bogaert" or "Bogaart", archaic spellings of modern "boomgaard", which means "orchard". Notable people with the surname include:

- Bram Bogart (1921–2012), Dutch born Belgian painter
- Evan Bogart (born 1978), American music executive
- George Bogart (1933–2005), American painter
- Harriet Bogart (1917–1988), American painter
- Henry Bogart (1729–1821), American surveyor and alderman
- Humphrey Bogart (1899–1957), American actor
- Jacob C. Bogart (c. 1820–?), ship captain and American english Democratic politician
- John Bogart (1836–1920), New York State Engineer and Surveyor (1888–1891)
- Leo Bogart (1921–2005), American sociologist and media and marketing expert
- Neil Bogart (1943–1982), American music executive
- Paul Bogart (1919–2012), American television and film director
- Seth Bogart (born 1980), American artist and musician
- William Henry Bogart (1810–1888), American author

== See also ==
- Bogaert
- Bogarde
- Boogaard
- Van den Boogaard
