= Baumgartner =

Baumgartner (also Baumgärtner, Baumgardner, Bumgardner, Bumgartner or Bumgarner) is a surname of German origin, literally meaning "Tree Gardener". It may refer to:

Baumgartner surname

- Ann Baumgartner (1918–2008), first American female jet pilot
- Beate Baumgartner (born 1983), Austrian-Namibian singer
- Brian Baumgartner (born 1972), American actor
- Bruce Baumgartner (born 1960), American wrestler
- Christoph Baumgartner (born 1999), Austrian footballer
- Felix Baumgartner (1969–2025), Austrian skydiver and base jumper
- Karl Baumgartner (1949–2014), German film producer
- Harold Baumgartner (1883–1938), South African cricketer
- James Earl Baumgartner (1943–2011), American mathematician
- Jason Baumgartner, American engineer
- Johann Wolfgang Baumgartner (1702–1761), German painter
- Joseph Baumgartner (1904–1964), Bavarian politician
- Julian Baumgartner, American art conservator
- Ken Baumgartner (born 1966), Canadian ice hockey player
- Michael Baumgartner (born 1975), American politician
- Nolan Baumgartner (born 1976), Canadian hockey player
- Monika Baumgartner (born 1951), German actress
- Patrick Baumgartner (born 1994), Italian bobsledder
- Paul Baumgartner (1903–1976), Swiss pianist
- Peter Baumgartner (businessman), Swiss businessman
- Rudolf Baumgartner (1917–2002), Swiss conductor and violinist
- Sandra Baumgartner (born 1982), German journalist and reporter
- Stan Baumgartner (1894–1955), American baseball player
- Steve Baumgartner (born 1951), American football player
- Tanja Ariane Baumgartner (born 19??), German mezzo-soprano
- Thomas Baumgartner (born c. 1945), American economist
- Zsolt Baumgartner (born 1981), Hungarian race driver

Baumgärtner surname

- Alexej Baumgärtner (born 1988), Russian-born German speed skater
- Jürgen Baumgärtner (born 1973), German politician
- Karl Heinrich Baumgärtner (1798–1886), German physician and pathologist
- Willy Baumgärtner (1890–1953), German footballer

Baumgardner surname

- Alycia Baumgardner, American boxer
- Jennifer Baumgardner (born 1970), American feminist and author
- John Baumgardner, American intelligent design proponent
- Randy Baumgardner (born 1956), American politician

Bumgardner surname

- Max Bumgardner (1923–2005), American football player
- Rex Bumgardner (1923–1998), American football player
- Heidi Gardner, American actress, comedian, and writer, Saturday Night Live

Bumgarner surname

- A. L. Bumgarner, NASCAR cup series owner from the 1950s
- Constance Bumgarner Gee, American scholar, memoirist, and advocate of the medical use of cannabis
- James Garner (1928–2014; born James Scott Bumgarner), American actor, producer, and voice artist
- Madison Bumgarner (born 1989), American baseball player
- Michael Bumgarner (born 1959), United States Army military police officer
- Michele Bumgarner (born 1989), Filipina racing driver
- Samantha Bumgarner (1878–1960), country and folk music performer

== See also ==
- Baumgartner's axiom in mathematics
- The Baumgartner Prize of the Vienna Academy of Sciences
- Jack Garner (born Jack Bumgarner) (1926–2011), American film and TV actor
- Baumgartner Restoration, a Chicago-based art restoration studio
