= Bogard =

Bogard may refer to:

== People ==
- Ben M. Bogard (1868–1951), American clergyman, author, educator, radio broadcaster, and debater
- Delia Bogard (1921–1995), American film actress and dancer
- Dick Bogard (1937–2003), baseball player, manager and scout
- Jan Bogard (died c. 1634), Flemish printer in Leuven and Douai
- Paul Bogard, American author and dark sky advocate
- Seth Bogart (born Seth Davis Bogard, 1980), American artist and musician

== Video game characters ==
- Terry Bogard, a video game character in the Fatal Fury series and one of the DLC characters in Super Smash Bros. Ultimate
- Andy Bogard and Jeff Bogard, characters in the video game series Fatal Fury

== Places ==
- Bogard, Missouri, a city in Carroll County, Missouri, United States
- Bogard Creek, a stream in Henry and Johnson counties, Missouri
- Bogard Township (disambiguation)

== See also ==
- Bogarde
- Boggart
