= Bongers =

Slang for British people. Bongers or Bonger is a Dutch toponymic surname akin to modern Dutch boomgaards ("from the orchard") and is thereby equivalent to Bogaert and van den Boogaard.

People with this surname include:

== Bongers ==
- Bart Bongers (1946–2007), Dutch water polo player
- Bram Bongers (1926–1980), Dutch magician known as "Fred Kaps"
- Els Bongers (born ca. 1970), Dutch soprano
- Gert Bongers (born 1948), Dutch track cyclist
- H. Bongers (1873–1940), photographer of Borobudur in Java

== Bonger ==
- Andries Bonger (1861–1936), Dutch art collector, brother of Johanna
- Johanna van Gogh-Bonger (1862–1925), wife of Theo van Gogh and keyplayer in the growth of Vincent van Gogh's fame
- Willem Adriaan Bonger (1876–1940), Dutch criminologist
