= Baumgarten (surname) =

Baumgarten is a German and Ashkenazi Jewish surname, likely indicating an ancestral lineage from a man who owned, lived or worked in an orchard; from Baum, meaning tree, and Garte(n) meaning enclosure (garden).

Notable people with the surname include:

- Alexander Gottlieb Baumgarten (1714–1762), German philosopher
- Alfred Baumgarten (1842–1919), Canadian chemist and businessman of German descent
- Armin Baumgarten (born 1967), German painter and sculptor
- Arthur Baumgarten (1884–1966), German-Swiss jurist and legal philosopher
- Bodo Baumgarten (1940–2022) German painter, sculptor, graphic artist, and educator.
- Charles Frederick Baumgarten (1739–1840), German-born violinist and organist in London
- Fritz Baumgarten (illustrator) (1883–1966), German artist, author, and children's author-illustrator
- Fritz Baumgarten (1886–1961), German footballer
- Hans Heinrich Baumgarten (1806 – 1875) Holstein-Danish industrialist
- Hermann Baumgarten (1825–1893), German historian and political publicist
- Konrad Baumgarten, hero of the Swiss liberation legend, character in the drama William Tell
- Joseph M. Baumgarten (1928–2008), rabbi and Semitic scholar
- Lothar Baumgarten (1944–2018), German artist
- Ludwig Friedrich Otto Baumgarten-Crusius (1788–1843), German Protestant theologian
- Martin Baumgarten (1507–?), German explorer
- Michael Baumgarten (1812–1889), German Protestant theologian
- Paul Clemens von Baumgarten (1848–1928), German pathologist
- Siegmund Jakob Baumgarten (1706–1757), German theologian
- Vasily Baumgarten (1879–1962), Russian and Yugoslavian architect

== See also ==
- Harald Paumgarten, Austrian cross country skier
- Baumgart
- Baumgartner
