= Kappa Sagittarii =

The Bayer designation Kappa Sagittarii (κ Sagittarii) is shared by two star systems, κ^{1} Sagittarii and κ^{2} Sagittarii, in the constellation Sagittarius. The two star systems are separated by 0.46° in the sky.

- κ^{1} Sagittarii
- κ^{2} Sagittarii
