= 24 Sextantis =

Star in the constellation Sextans

Observation data Epoch J2000 Equinox ICRS
- Constellation: Sextans
- Right ascension: 10^{h} 23^{m} 28.3694^{s}
- Declination: −00° 54′ 08.077″
- Apparent magnitude (V): 6.61±0.04

Characteristics
- Spectral type: K0 IV
- B−V color index: 0.92±0.01

Astrometry
Radial velocity (R_{v})	7.08±0.16 km/s
Proper motion (μ)	RA: +65.220±0.167 mas/yr Dec.: −36.272±0.244 mas/yr
Parallax (π)	13.8488±0.1298 mas
Distance	236 ± 2 ly (72.2 ± 0.7 pc)
Absolute magnitude (M_{V})	2.17±0.06

Details
Mass	1.55±0.16 M_{☉}
Radius	4.9±0.08 R_{☉}
Luminosity	14.6±0.1 L_{☉}
Surface gravity (log g)	3.5±0.1 cgs
Temperature	5098±44 K
Metallicity [Fe/H]	−0.03±0.04 dex
Rotational velocity (v sin i)	2.77±0.5 km/s
Age	2.7±0.4 Gyr

Other designations
- BD−00°2332, HD 90043, HIP 50887, SAO 137532

Database references
SIMBAD	data

24 Sextantis, often abbreviated as 24 Sex, is the Flamsteed designation of a 7th-magnitude star located approximately 236 light years away in the constellation of Sextans. At an apparent visual magnitude of 6.61, this star can only be viewed from rural skies under good seeing conditions.

At the age of 2.8 billion years, it has reached an evolutionary stage called a subgiant star, having a stellar classification of K0 IV. It has 54% more mass than the Sun, but the outer envelope has become cooler than the Sun's as it slowly expands into a giant star.

The star is known to have two giant extrasolar planets.

== Planetary system ==
On July 26, 2010 the California and Carnegie Planet Search team announced the discovery of two planets around 24 Sextantis along with two planets around HD 200964. The inner planet is twice as massive as Jupiter and takes 453 days to orbit the star in a circular orbit at the average distance of 1.33 AU (199 million km). The outer planet is ^{5}/_{6} the mass of Jupiter and takes 883 days to orbit eccentrically around the star at the average distance of 2.08 AU (312 million km).

The two planets are in a 2:1 resonance, meaning that the outer planet orbits the star once every time when the inner planet orbits the star twice. The planetary system was found to be unstable in 2019.

The 24 Sextantis planetary system
Companion (in order from star)	Mass	Semimajor axis (AU)	Orbital period (days)	Eccentricity	Inclination (°)	Radius
b	≥1.99^{+0.26}_{−0.38} M_{J}	1.333^{+0.004}_{−0.009}	452.8^{+2.1}_{−4.5}	0.09^{+0.14}_{−0.06}	—	—
c	≥0.86^{+0.35}_{−0.26} M_{J}	2.08^{+0.05}_{−0.02}	883^{+32}_{−14}	0.29^{+0.16}_{−0.09}	—	—

== See also ==
- HD 200964
- Lists of exoplanets
