= William Bogart =

William Bogart may refer to:

- William Henry Bogart (1810–1888), American politician and historian
- William G. Bogart (1903–1977), American writer
- William Bogart (1936–2005), stage name of Italian actor Guglielmo Spoletini who appeared in westerns (Death Knows No Time)

== See also ==
- William Bogert (1936–2020), American character actor
- Bogart (disambiguation)
