= Peter Baumgartner =

Peter Baumgartner may refer to:

- Peter Baumgartner (cinematographer) (1939–2021), Swiss cinematographer
- Peter Baumgartner (footballer), Swiss former footballer
- Peter Baumgartner (ice hockey) (born 1991), German ice hockey player
- Peter Baumgartner (businessman), Swiss businessman and CEO of Etihad Airways
