= Baumgarten =

Baumgarten may refer to:

== Places ==
- Baumgarten, Burgenland, Austria
- Baumgarten, Vienna, Austria
- Baumgarten an der March, Austria (the natural gas hub)
- Baumgarten, Germany, a municipality in Mecklenburg-Vorpommern, Germany

== Other uses ==
- Baumgarten (surname)
- Baumgarten Prize, a former literary award in Hungary
