= Kappa1 Sagittarii =

Binary star in the constellation Sagittarius

κ^{1} Sagittarii
- Location of κ^{1} Sagittarii (circled)

Observation data Epoch J2000.0 Equinox J2000.0 (ICRS)
- Constellation: Sagittarius
- Right ascension: 20^{h} 22^{m} 27.50366^{s}
- Declination: −42° 02′ 58.3648″
- Apparent magnitude (V): +5.58

Characteristics
- Evolutionary stage: main sequence
- Spectral type: A0 V + M2—2.5V
- U−B color index: −0.008
- B−V color index: +0.004

Astrometry
Radial velocity (R_{v})	−11.6 km/s
Proper motion (μ)	RA: +41.312 mas/yr Dec.: −83.742 mas/yr
Parallax (π)	14.6086±0.1738 mas
Distance	223 ± 3 ly (68.5 ± 0.8 pc)
Absolute magnitude (M_{V})	1.47

Details

κ^{1} Sgr A
Mass	2.23±0.02 M_{☉}
Radius	1.85±0.10 R_{☉}
Luminosity	27.7±1.0 L_{☉}
Surface gravity (log g)	4.33 cgs
Temperature	9,740±100 K
Rotational velocity (v sin i)	71 km/s
Age	66 or 161+247 −35 Myr

κ^{1} Sgr B
Mass	0.305±0.025 or 0.395±0.007 M_{☉}
Surface gravity (log g)	4.9 cgs
Temperature	3,500 K

Other designations
- κ^{1} Sgr, CD−42°14836, HD 193571, HIP 100469, HR 7779, SAO 230177, WDS J20225-4203

Database references
SIMBAD	data

Kappa^{1} Sagittarii (κ^{1} Sagittarii) is a binary star in the zodiac constellation of Sagittarius. It has an apparent visual magnitude of +5.58, which is bright enough to be faintly visible to the naked eye. According to the Bortle scale, it can be viewed from dark suburban skies. Based upon an annual parallax shift of 15.12 mas as seen from Earth, this star is located around 223 light years from the Sun. It is advancing in the general direction of the Sun with a radial velocity of −11.6 km/s.

== Characteristics ==
The primary component is an A-type main sequence star with a stellar classification of A0 V. It displays an infrared excess, with the measured radiation indicating the star is orbited by a two-component debris disk. The radius of this disk is 120 astronomical units. The star is about 161 million years old with 2.23 times the mass of the Sun and 1.7 times the Sun's radius. It is radiating 27.5 times the Sun's luminosity from its photosphere at an effective temperature of roughly 9,962 K.

Its companion is a red dwarf star orbiting with a semi-major axis of at least 8.20±1.77 astronomical units, placing it inside the debris disk.

There are two visual companions: component B is a magnitude 12.6 star at an angular separation of 39.3 arc seconds along a position angle of 312°, as of 2000; component C is magnitude 11.6 with a separation of 56.8 arc seconds along a position angle of 283°, as of 1999. Neither star is physically associated with Kappa^{1} Sagittarii.
