= The End of Night (book) =

Non-fiction book by Paul Bogard

The End of Night: Searching for Natural Darkness in an Age of Artificial Light
- Author: Paul Bogard
- Cover artist: Tyler Nordgren
- Subject: Night, light pollution
- Published: July 9, 2013 (North America: Little, Brown and Company; Global: 4th Estate/HarperCollins)
- Media type: Print, e-book, audiobook
- Pages: 336 p.
- ISBN: 9780316182904 (L.B. hardcover)
- OCLC: 862589287
- Dewey Decimal: 551.56/6
- LC Class: TD195.L52 B64 2013
- Website: http://www.paul-bogard.com/books-and-writings/

The End of Night: Searching for Natural Darkness in an Age of Artificial Light is a 2013 non-fiction book by Paul Bogard on the gradual disappearance, due to light pollution, of true darkness from the night skies of most people on the planet. Bogard examines the effects of this loss on human physical and mental health, society, and ecosystems, and how it might be mitigated.

The book has been translated into Chinese, German, Japanese, Korean, and Spanish.

== Synopsis ==
The nine chapters of Bogard's book map to the nine levels of the Bortle scale, which attempts to quantify the subjective brightness and suitability for astronomy of the sky in different environments. Bogard has said of the scale, invented in 2001, "one of the reasons why identifying different depths of darkness is so important is that we don't recognize that we're losing it, unless we have a name to recognize it by."

Bogard begins at a Bortle level 9 environment, by the Luxor Sky Beam, the brightest spotlight on Earth, located on the Las Vegas Strip. He explores the nighttime landscapes of London and Paris, and examines the planning, or lack thereof, in each city's lighting. He visits locations throughout the continental US, as well as Florence, the Canary Islands, and the isle of Sark, in his quest to understand the nature of light pollution. He experiences firsthand the deleterious effects of night shift work, talks with a former prison inmate about the psychological effects of uninterrupted light, and shares his own fear of the dark. Bogard ultimately finds a Bortle level 1 environment: a remote area so perfectly free of stray light that, with eyes fully adapted, the Milky Way casts noticeable shadows.

Bogard argues against the long-held assumption of a correlation between bright light and reduced crime, citing research that finds no such link. Rather than suggesting a return to the completely unlit nights of centuries past, however, he argues for a careful consideration of where and how artificial light is deployed, in order to provide sufficient nighttime illumination for safety, without creating glare and other unwanted effects.

== Reception ==
Telegraph reviewer Stephanie Cross wrote that "the appeal of Bogard’s book derives not just from his often wide-eyed enthusiasm for his subject, but also from the constellation of characters he encounters on his journeys into the night." In The Guardian, novelist Salley Vickers wrote that "Bogard sets about his investigations with an energetic purposiveness and enterprise," but complained that "the book comes to seem a little thin, moving too rapidly from one chatty anecdotal meeting to another." The Wall Street Journal questioned Bogard's statements on the relationship between light and safety, and concluded ambivalently: "The End of Night delivers a forceful, if incomplete, critique of our overexposed world."

=== Awards ===
The book was awarded the 2014 Nautilus Silver Award. It was named an Amazon Best Book of the Month and Nonfiction Editor's Pick for July 2013, and Gizmodo selected it as one of its Best Books of 2013. The book was shortlisted for the PEN/E. O. Wilson Literary Science Writing Award, and was a finalist for the Sigurd F. Olson Nature Writing Award.

== See also ==
- International Dark-Sky Association
- Skyglow – Diffuse luminance of the night sky
