= John E. Bortle =

American amateur astronomer

John E. Bortle is an American amateur astronomer. He is best known for creating the Bortle scale to quantify the darkness of the night sky.

Bortle has made a special study of comets. He has recorded thousands of observations relating to more than 300 comets. From 1977 until 1994 he authored the monthly '"Comet Digest" in Sky and Telescope magazine. He also had a special interest in variable stars. After joining the AAVSO in 1963, Bortle contributed more than 215,000 visual observations to the AAVSO's database before retiring from the organization in 2020.. From 1970 until 2000 he edited the monthly AAVSO circular for the American Association of Variable Star Observers. He published his darkness scale in Sky and Telescope magazine in 2001. The scale ranges from 1 (extremely dark rural area or national park, usually at high elevation, low humidity, and low wind) to 9 (urban inner city). Today that scale is widely used throughout the world by the amateur astronomy community for ascertaining and relating their sky conditions to colleagues.

John Bortle created a predictive model to calculate if a comet would survive perihelion or not, known as the Bortle survival limit. According to it, if the comet is brighter than H10 = 7.0 + 6q, where H10 is the absolute magnitude of the comet and q the perihelion distance in astronomical units, it was likely to survive.

== Recognition ==
- Astronomical Society of the Pacific's Comet Medal (1974) for significant contributions to the research of comets.
- American Association of Variable Star Observers 23rd Merit Award (1983), for his editorship of the AAVSO Circular and observing record.
- E.E.Barnard Observers Award of the Western Amateur Astronomers (1990), for his observational work on comets.
- The asteroid 4673 Bortle was named in his honor by the International Astronomical Union.
- Walter Scott Houston Award of the Northeast Region of the Astronomical League (2010).
- Leslie Peltier Award from the Astronomical League (2013).
