= Van den Boogaard =

Van den Boogaard is a Dutch toponymic surname meaning "from the orchard" (modern Dutch "boomgaard"). The surname has a very high number of alternative forms. People with this and closely similar names include:

== Van den Boogaard ==
- Dillianne van den Boogaard (born 1974), Dutch field hockey player
- Erik-Jan van den Boogaard (born 1964), Dutch footballer
- Nico H.J. van den Boogaard (1938–1982), Dutch medievalist and academic
- Oscar van den Boogaard (born 1964), Dutch writer
- Patrick van den Boogaard (born 1995), Dutch darts player
- Theo van den Boogaard (born 1948), Dutch cartoonist

== Van den Boogaart ==
- Abraham van den Boogaart (1921–2012), Dutch-Belgian painter known as Bram Bogart
- Joep van den Boogaart (1939–2017), Dutch PVDA politician
- Mark van den Boogaart (born 1985), Dutch football midfielder

== Van den Bogaerde ==
- Andreas van den Bogaerde van Terbrugge (1787–1855), Dutch politician and art collector
- Derek van den Bogaerde (1921–1999), English actor and writer known as Dirk Bogarde
- Jasmine van den Bogaerde (born 1996), English singer and songwriter known as Birdy

== Van den Bogaert ==
- Bryan Van Den Bogaert (born 1991), Belgian football defender
- Jeroen Van den Bogaert (born 1979), Belgian alpine skier
- Martin van den Bogaert (1637–1694), Dutch-French sculptor known as Martin Desjardins

== Van den Boogerd/Van den Boogert ==
- Dominic van den Boogerd (born 1959), Dutch art critic and art historian
- Maurits van den Boogert (born 1972), Dutch writer on Ottoman history

== See also ==
- Bogaard
- Bogaert
- Boogaard
- Boogaerts
