= Henri Bogaert =

Belgian economist

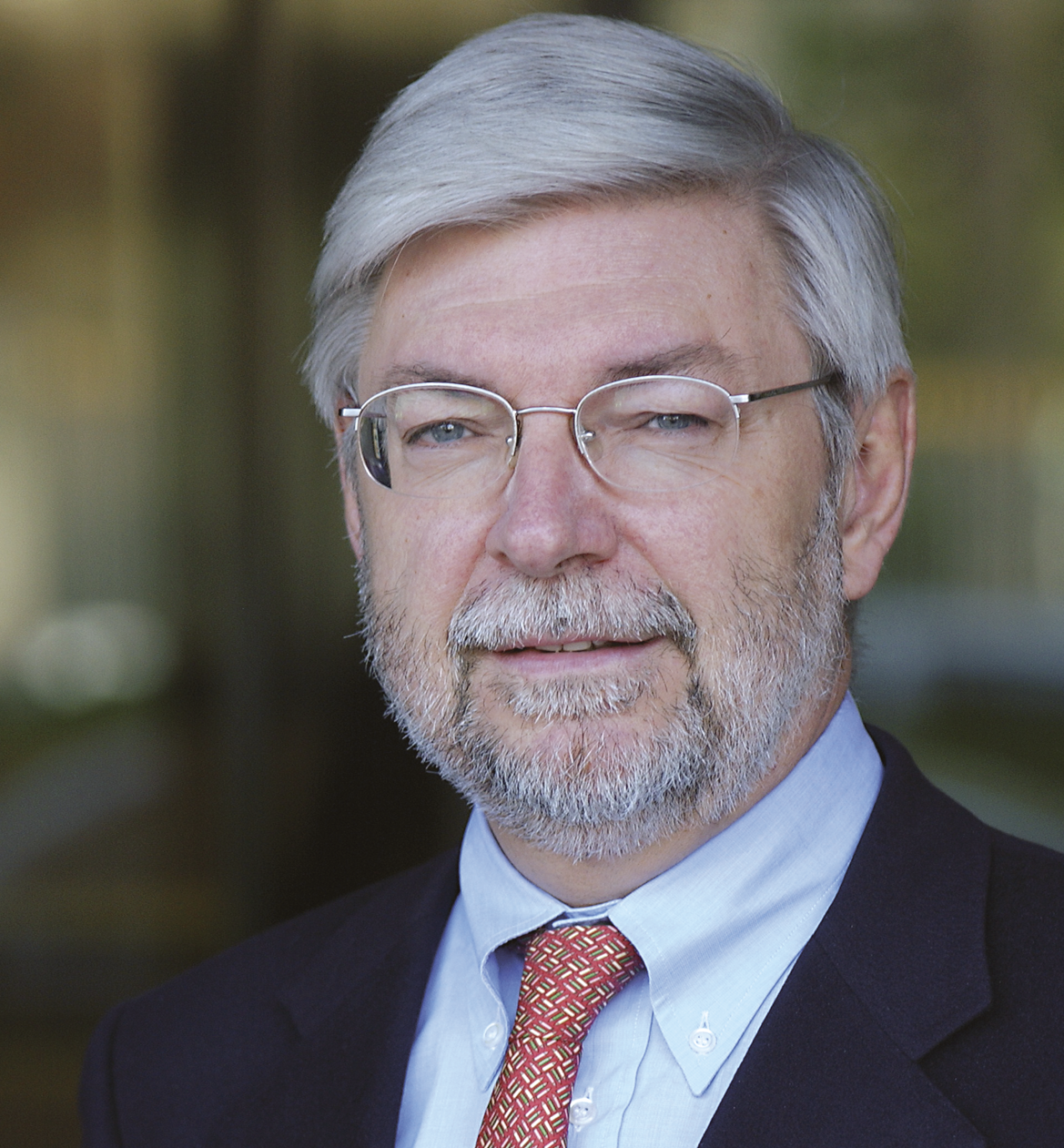
Henri Bogaert

Henri Bogaert, born on April 22, 1948, is a Belgian economist. From 1993 to 2014, he has been director of the Belgian Federal Planning Bureau (Plan Commissioner) and, until he retired in 2017, he was also professor of economic policy at the University of Namur.

== Biography ==
Bogaert studied economics at the University of Namur (Belgium). After his studies he worked for the Belgian Federal Planning Bureau as a member of the team undertaking macro-economic modelling, analyses and forecasts. In 1980, he anticipated the explosion of public debt in Belgium and pointed out "the snowball effect of debt". In 1982, he was part of the team responsible for preparing the devaluation of the Belgian franc. From 1989 to 1990, he participated in the foundation of a private company (ADE) specialized in economic studies. From 1990 to 1992, as deputy director of the economic advisers of the Prime Minister, he prepared the first Belgian convergence programme designed to introduce the euro. In 1993, he was appointed director of the Federal Planning Bureau by the Government and took part in the group of experts designated by the Government to prepare the Social Pact that would lead the government to adopt the "Global Plan for employment, competitiveness and social security" which aimed to restore the Belgian economy after the sharp crisis in 1993. Henri Bogaert has also been member and chairman of the European Economic Policy Committee as well as, from 2000 to 2010, Chairman of the Working Group on ageing of population and fiscal sustainability. In this context, he contributed to the addition of criteria for sustainability of public finances to the Stability and Growth Pact. In addition, he has been Deputy Chairman of the OECD Economic Policy Committee.

== Selected publications ==
- Bogaert, H., Déficit des finances publiques: l’effet boule de neige, 6ème Congrès des économistes de langue française, CIFoP (1984)
- Bogaert, H., T. de Biolley and R. Maldague : Between Theory and Policy : Is the Planner a Necessary Go-Between ?, in A. Steinherr and D. Weiserbs (eds), Employment and Growth: Issues for the 1980s. ISBN 90-247-3514-9. 1987, Martinus Nijhoff, Dordrecht.
- Bogaert, H., T. de Biolley and J. Verlinden, 1990. A Disequilibrium Model of the Belgian Economy. Economic Modelling, p. 310-375
- Bogaert, H., B. Delbecque (1994), L’incidence de la dette publique et du vieillissement démographique sur la conduite de la politique budgétaire : une étude théorique appliquée au cas de la Belgique, Bureau fédéral du Plan, Planning Paper n° 70.
- Bogaert, Henri. "Long-term fiscal sustainability in Belgium". Fiscal Sustainability, Essays presented at the Bank of Italy workshop held in Perugia, 20–22 January 2000. pp. 303–341. doi:10.2139/ssrn.2109445.
- Bogaert H. and Père T., Consolidation of public finances in Belgium: an example of application of European norms in a state with a federal structure, in Banca d’Italia ed. Fiscal Rules, Rome (2001).
- Bogaert, H., Dobbelaere, L., Hertveldt, B. and Lebrun, I., Fiscal Councils, independent forecasts and the budgetary process: lessons from the Belgian case, Belgian Federal Planning Bureau, W.P. 4-06. (2006).
