= HD 200964 =

Star in the constellation Equuleus

Observation data Epoch J2000 Equinox ICRS
- Constellation: Equuleus
- Right ascension: 21^{h} 06^{m} 39.842^{s}
- Declination: +03° 48′ 11.23″
- Apparent magnitude (V): +6.48

Characteristics
- Evolutionary stage: subgiant
- Spectral type: G8 IV
- B−V color index: 0.880±0.009

Astrometry
Radial velocity (R_{v})	−72.63±0.03 km/s
Proper motion (μ)	RA: 94.748 mas/yr Dec.: 50.418 mas/yr
Parallax (π)	13.7656±0.0275 mas
Distance	236.9 ± 0.5 ly (72.6 ± 0.1 pc)
Absolute magnitude (M_{V})	+2.19

Details
Mass	1.44±0.09 M_{☉}
Radius	4.30±0.09 R_{☉}
Luminosity	13.758±0.064 L_{☉}
Surface gravity (log g)	3.6±0.1 cgs
Temperature	5,164±44 K
Metallicity [Fe/H]	−0.15±0.04 dex
Rotational velocity (v sin i)	2.28±0.5 km/s
Age	3.0±0.6 Gyr

Other designations
- 10 G. Equ, BD+03°4501, HD 200964, HIP 104202, SAO 126546

Database references
SIMBAD	data

HD 200964 is a star with a pair of orbiting exoplanets located in the northern constellation of Equuleus. It has an apparent visual magnitude of +6.48, which puts it at the lower limit of visibility to the naked eye, but binoculars would make it easy to see. Based on parallax measurements, the distance to this system is 238 light years, but it is drifting closer with a heliocentric radial velocity of −72.6 km/s.

This is a G-type subgiant star with a stellar classification of G8 IV. It is a 3.3 billion year old star that has exhausted the supply of hydrogen at its core and evolved away from the main sequence, where it was an A-type star. It has now close to the base of the red giant branch. The star has 44% more mass than the Sun and is spinning with a projected rotational velocity of 2.3 km/s. The abundance of iron, an indicator of the star's metallicity, is lower than in the Sun. The star has swelled to 4.3 times the radius of the Sun and it is radiating nearly 14 times the Sun's luminosity from its enlarged photosphere at an effective temperature of 5,164 K.

== Planetary system ==
On July 26, 2010 the California and Carnegie Planet Search team announced the discovery of two planets around HD 200964 along with two planets around 24 Sextantis. The inner planet is nearly twice as massive as Jupiter and takes 614 days to orbit the star in a circular orbit at the average distance of 1.60 AU (240 million km). The outer planet is ^{9}/_{10} the mass of Jupiter and takes 825 days to orbit eccentrically around the star at the average distance of 1.95 AU (292 million km).

Due to the close proximity of the two planets to each other the discoverers only found stable orbits near the 4:3 resonance, meaning that every time the outer planet orbits the star three times, the inner planet orbits the star four times. The two planets are separated by only 0.35 AU. Because of the small separation between the two massive planets, the gravitational tugs between the two planets is nearly 3 million times greater than the gravitational force between Earth and Mars, 700 times larger than that between Earth and the Moon, and 4 times larger than the pull of the Sun on Earth. After additional radial velocity measurements were taken stable solutions in the 7:5 and 3:2 mean-motion resonances were found in addition to the 4:3 mean-motion resonance. The 7:5 configuration currently provides the best match to the measurements.

There is evidence of a possible third planet in the system with a period of ~7 days however the three planet model of the system is only slightly better than the two planet model.

The HD 200964 planetary system
Companion (in order from star)	Mass	Semimajor axis (AU)	Orbital period (days)	Eccentricity	Inclination (°)	Radius
b	≥1.85^{+0.14}_{−0.08} M_{J}	1.601 ± 0.002	613.8^{+1.3}_{−1.4}	0.04^{+0.04}_{−0.02}	—	0.85 R_{J}
c	≥0.90^{+0.12}_{−0.06} M_{J}	1.950^{+0.008}_{−0.005}	825.0^{+3.1}_{−5.1}	0.181^{+0.024}_{−0.017}	—	0.85 R_{J}

== See also ==
- 24 Sextantis
- List of extrasolar planets
