= Bogert =

Bogert is a Dutch surname. Notable people with the surname include:

- Charles Mitchill Bogert (1908–1992), American herpetologist
- Frank Bogert (1910–2009), American politician
- George Henry Bogert (1864–1944), American landscape painter
- Louis van den Bogert (1924–2002), Dutch footballer
- Margot Bogert, American recipient
- Marston T. Bogert (1868–1954), American chemist
- Steven Bogert, American politician
- Tim Bogert (1944–2021), American bass guitar player
- Victor van den Bogert (born 1999), Dutch footballer
- William Bogert (1936–2020), American character actor
