= Bogart (disambiguation) =

Humphrey Bogart (1899–1957) was an American actor.

Bogart or Boggart may also refer to:

== People ==
- Bogart (surname), lists people with surname Bogart
- Bogart Leashore (1947–2007), American sociologist, social worker, and academic administrator
- Bogart Rogers (1897–1966), American motion picture writer and producer and World War I flying ace
- "Bogart", nickname of American Idol contestant Bo Bice

== Places ==
- Bogart, Georgia, a town
- Bogart, Ohio, an unincorporated community
- Bogart, Ontario, Canada, a settlement
- Bogart's, a Cincinnati, Ohio, music venue
- Bogart's (Long Beach, California), a former music venue.

== Magical creature ==
- Boggart or bogart, a creature in Celtic mythology
- Boggart, a magical creature in the Harry Potter universe
- Boggart (Dungeons & Dragons) a magical creature in the Dungeons and Dragons universe.

== Other uses ==
- A variant of the fedora (hat)
- "Bogart", a song by Nik Kershaw
- Slang term used to describe a marijuana user who doesn't pass the "joint".
