= Paul Bogard =

American author

Paul Bogard is an American author and dark sky advocate. A native Minnesotan, Bogard grew up exploring the forest and watching the stars near a lake in the northern part of the state. He has lived and taught in New Mexico, Nevada, Wisconsin, North Carolina, and Virginia. He is currently an associate professor of English at Hamline University.

== Awards and honors ==
- 2014: PEN/E. O. Wilson Literary Science Writing Award shortlist for The End of Night

== Works ==
=== Books ===
- The End of Night: Searching for Natural Darkness in an Age of Artificial Light (Little, Brown, 2013)
- The Ground Beneath Us: From the Oldest Cities to the Last Wilderness, What Dirt Tells Us About Who We Are (Little, Brown, 2017)
- To Know a Starry Night (University of Nevada Press, 2021)
- What if Night (Keystone Canyon Press, 2020)

=== Notable articles ===
- "Where Are All the Wild Things, Daddy?" New York Times Modern Love (June 18, 2021)
- "A New Golden Age of Observation is Revealing the Wonders of Night Migration". Audubon (Spring 2021)
