= Baumgartner Restoration =

American art conservation studio

- Born: Julian Baumgartner

YouTube information
- Channel: Baumgartner Restoration
- Years active: 2016-present
- Genre: Art conservancy
- Subscribers: 1.93 million
- Views: 215 million
- Last updated: 30 January 2026
- Website: baumgartnerfineartrestoration.com

Baumgartner Fine Art Restoration, commonly known as Baumgartner Restoration, is a Chicago-based art conservation studio operating a YouTube channel of the same name.

== History ==
In 1978, Rene Agass Baumgartner established the studio in Chicago. He was born in Switzerland and had studied at both the Luzerne Academy of Art and École des Beaux-Arts. His son Julian, who had begun working with him in 2000, took over the studio after Agass' death in 2011 at age 63. In 2016, Julian started a YouTube channel documenting himself restoring various artworks, becoming well-received and attracting media coverage.
