= Jason Baumgartner =

American electrical engineer

Jason Raymond Baumgartner, from the IBM Corporation, was named Fellow of the Institute of Electrical and Electronics Engineers (IEEE) in 2015 for contributions to formal hardware verification and its application.
