= Louis van den Bogert =

Dutch footballer

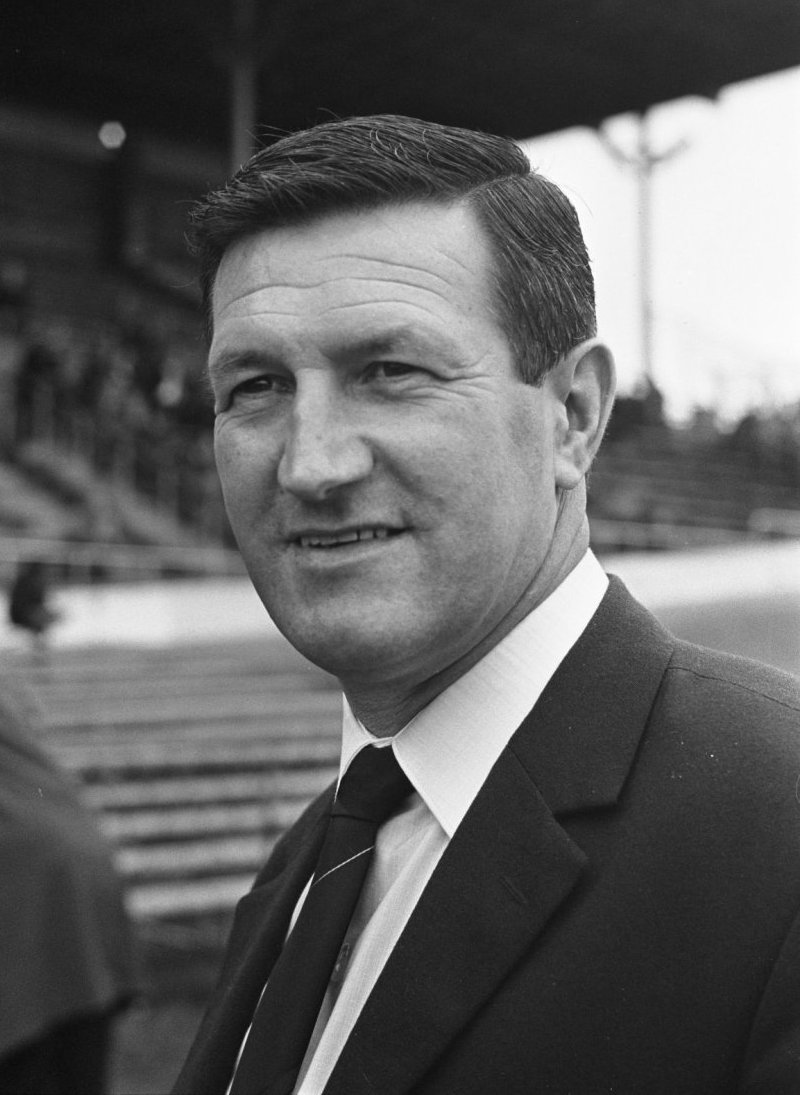

Personal information
- Full name: Johannes Louis van den Bogert
- Date of birth: 14 February 1924
- Place of birth: Utrecht, Netherlands
- Date of death: 20 November 2002 (aged 78)
- Place of death: Utrecht, Netherlands

Senior career*
| Years | Team | Apps | (Gls) |
| 1941–1963 | DOS | | |

International career
| 1951–1953 | Netherlands | 3 | (0) |
- * Club domestic league appearances and goals

Louis van den Bogert (14 February 1924 – 20 November 2002) was a Dutch footballer. He played in three matches for the Netherlands national football team from 1951 to 1953.

He scored three goals in 171 Eredivisie matches for DOS from the start of the league in 1956 until his retirement in 1962.

== Personal life ==
His brothers Joop and Ries also played for DOS.
