= Sandra Baumgartner =

German sports journalist and reporter (born 1982)

- Born: 1982 (age 43–44); Munich, Bavaria, West Germany
- Occupations: Sports journalist; Television reporter
- Years active: 2002–present
- Employer: Sky Deutschland

Sandra Baumgartner (born 1982) is a German sports journalist and reporter. She has worked as a freelance reporter and presenter for several German television stations and reported on various sports programmes. Baumgartner worked at German pay-TV channel Motorvision TV before joining Sky Deutschland in 2011, reading the hourly news bulletins on Sky Sport News HD before becoming a pit lane reporter on Formula One races in 2012.

== Biography ==
Baumgartner was born in 1982 in Munich and grew up in the city. When she was in the final year of high school, she decided to embark on a career in broadcasting in television. Following graduation from high school, Baumgartner did a two-year internship at a Munich television production company. She made reports for magazines, documentaries and corporate videos for industrial clients films.

Between 2002 and 2007, she was a freelance reporter and television presenter for multiple television stations. These stations included ARD, DMAX, Kabel eins, ProSieben, RTL Zwei, Sat.1 and VOX. In 2008, Baumgartner received a job offer to work at the German pay-TV channel Motorvision TV. She became a reporter and journalist for the channel on various programmes about the Daytona 500, the Deutsche Tourenwagen Masters, the Nürburgring 24 Hours and the International Motor Show Germany in Frankfurt. Furthermore, Baumgartner read the news on the Motorvision TV News bulletin and presented the Mission Mobility and Supercars programmes. She wanted a change and joined Sky Deutschland in 2011, who were employing editorial staff, presenters and reporters. Baumgartner a founder member of the editorial team for the sport news channel Sky Sport News HD. At first, she was the presenter of hourly news bulletins on the channel.

She began reporting on Formula One races on site from the 2012 Monaco Grand Prix. Baumgartner also began covering the support Porsche Supercup races that are held inbetween Formula One sessions, and has reported on the UEFA Champions League and the 2012 Summer Olympics in London. In 2019, after Sky regained the broadcast rights to Formula One in Germany, she became the channel's pit lane reporter. Baumgartner became a co-presenter of Sky Deutschland's coverage of MotoGP from the 2024 season onwards.

== Personal life ==
She married the public relations agency owner Thomas Doriath in May 2019. The couple have one child.
