= Boogaerts =

Boogaerts is a surname. Notable people with the surname include:

- Frank Boogaerts (born 1944), Belgian politician
- Mathieu Boogaerts (born 1970), French singer-songwriter
