= Kappa2 Sagittarii =

Star in the constellation Sagittarius

Kappa^{2} Sagittarii
- Location of κ^{2} Sagittarii (circled)

Observation data Epoch J2000.0 Equinox J2000.0 (ICRS)
- Constellation: Sagittarius
- Right ascension: 20^{h} 23^{m} 53.17666^{s}
- Declination: −42° 25′ 22.3376″
- Apparent magnitude (V): +5.64 (6.04 + 7.12)

Characteristics
- Spectral type: A5 V (A1 + A6)
- U−B color index: +0.099
- B−V color index: +0.192

Astrometry
Radial velocity (R_{v})	+2.6 km/s
Proper motion (μ)	RA: −13.07 mas/yr Dec.: +13.64 mas/yr
Parallax (π)	10.47±0.50 mas
Distance	310 ± 10 ly (96 ± 5 pc)
Absolute magnitude (M_{V})	1.03/2.35

Orbit
Period (P)	700 yr
Semi-major axis (a)	2.032″
Eccentricity (e)	0.401
Inclination (i)	80°
Longitude of the node (Ω)	40.7°
Periastron epoch (T)	1912.00
Argument of periastron (ω) (secondary)	177.3°

Details

κ^{2} Sgr A
Mass	1.85 M_{☉}
Luminosity	38 L_{☉}
Surface gravity (log g)	4.03 cgs
Temperature	7,990±272 K
Age	833 Myr

Other designations
- κ^{2} Sgr, CD−42°14847, HD 193807, HIP 100591, HR 7787, SAO 230184, WDS J20239-4225

Database references
SIMBAD	data

Kappa^{2} Sagittarii (κ^{2} Sagittarii) is a binary star system in the zodiac constellation of Sagittarius. It is visible to the naked eye with a combined apparent visual magnitude of +5.64. Based upon an annual parallax shift of 10.47 mas as seen from Earth, this system is located around 310 light years from the Sun. They are receding with a radial velocity of +2.6 km/s.

This is a visual binary system with the components orbiting each other over a period of roughly 700 years, having an eccentricity of 0.4 and a semimajor axis of 2 arc seconds. The pair have a combined spectral type that matches an A-type main sequence star with a stellar classification of A5 V. The individual components are of estimated types A1 and A6. The primary member, component A, is a magnitude 6.04 star with 1.85 times the mass of the Sun. It is radiating 38 times the Sun's luminosity from its photosphere at an effective temperature of about 7,990 K. The companion, component B, is visual magnitude 7.12.

There are two visual companions: component C is a magnitude 14.3 star at an angular separation of 18.6 arc seconds along a position angle of 266°, as of 2000; component D is magnitude 14.0 with a separation of 29.8 arc seconds along a position angle of 219°, also as of 2000.
