= Michael Baumgarten =

German Protestant theologian (1812–1889)

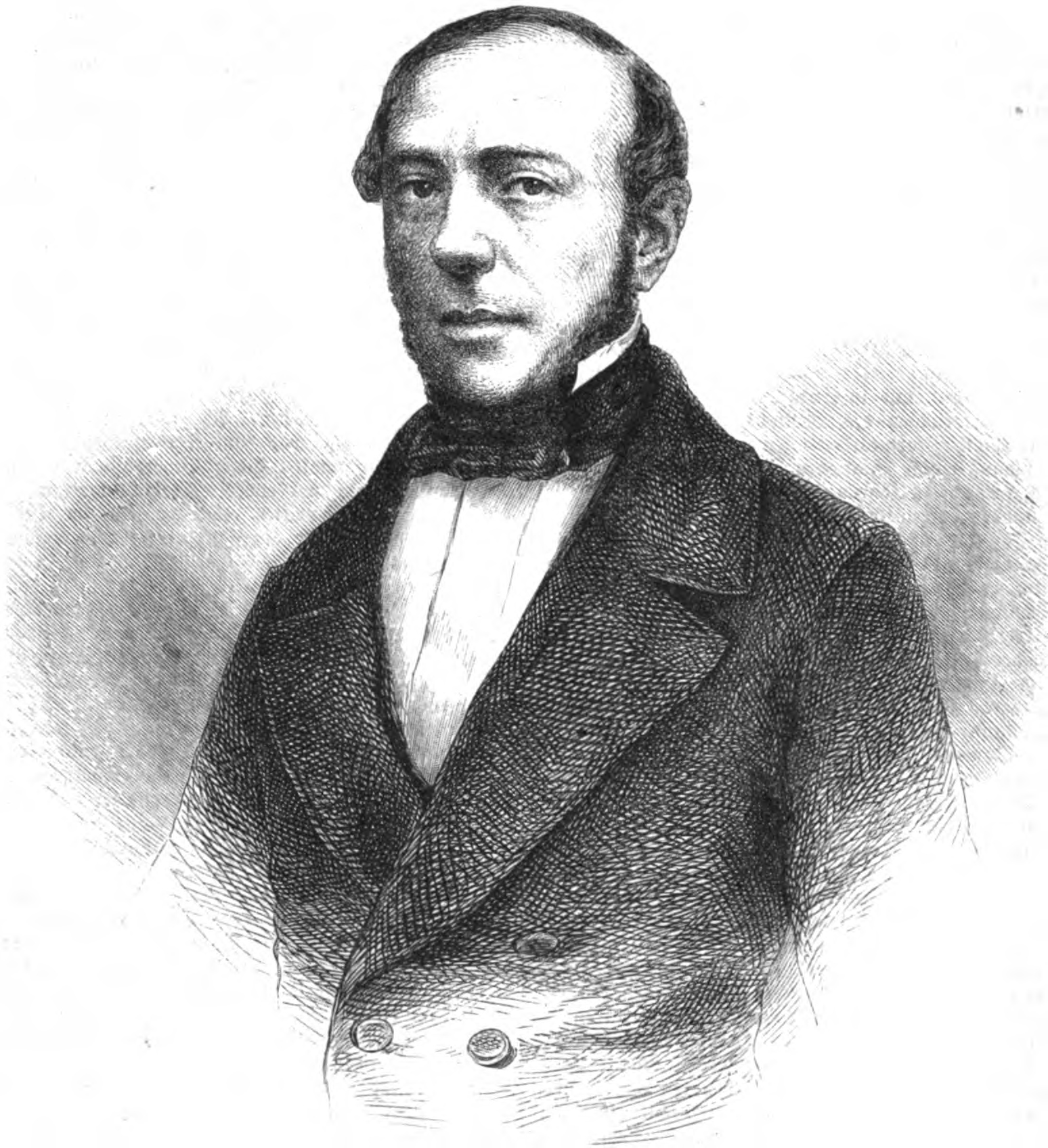
Michael Baumgarten

Michael Baumgarten (25 March 1812 – 21 July 1889) was a German Protestant theologian. Baumgarten was born at Haseldorf in Schleswig-Holstein.

== Life ==
He studied at Kiel University (1832), and became professor ordinarius of theology at Rostock (1850). A liberal scholar, he became widely known in 1854 through a work, Die Nachtgesichte Sacharjas. Eine Prophetenstimme aus der Gegenwart, in which, starting from texts in the Old Testament and assuming the tone of a prophet, he discussed topics of every kind.

At a pastoral conference in 1856 he boldly defended evangelical freedom as regards the legal sanctity of Sunday. This, with other attempts to liberalize religion, brought him into conflict with the ecclesiastical authorities of Mecklenburg, and in 1858 he was deprived of his professorship.

He then travelled throughout Germany, demanding justice, telling the story of his life ("Christliche Selbstgesprache", 1861), and lecturing on the life of Jesus ("Die Geschichte Jesu: für das Verständniss der Gegenwart", 1859). In 1865 he helped to found the Deutsche Protestantenverein, but withdrew from it in 1877. On several occasions (1874, 1877 and 1878) he sat in the Reichstag as a member of the progressive party.

== Other published works ==
- Die Apostelgeschichte, oder, der Entwickelungsgang der Kirche von Jerusalem bis Rom: Ein biblisch-historischer Versuch, (1852, second edition 1859), translated into English by A. J. W. Morrison as [The Acts of the Apostles: or, The history of the church in the Apostolic age], 1854.
- Doktor Martin Luther, ein Volksbuch (1881).

Hans Hinrich Studt published his autobiography in 1891 (2 volumes); see also Karl Schwarz, Zur Geschichte der neuesten Theologie (1856, 4th edition 1869); Frédéric Auguste Lichtenberger, "History of German theology in the nineteenth century" (1889); Paul Zeller, Calwer Bibellexikon.
