= Bogard Creek =

Stream in the American state of Missouri

Bogard Creek is a stream in northern Henry and southern Johnson counties in the U.S. state of Missouri.

The stream headwaters are in northwest Henry County north of Creighton and Missouri Route 35 at 38°31′05″N 94°02′23″W. The stream flows northeast to its confluence with Big Creek (old channel) just north of the county line in Johnson County at 38°34′02″N 94°01′10″W.

Bogard Creek has the name of a pioneer citizen.

== See also ==
- List of rivers of Missouri
