= Alfred Baumgarten =

Baron Alfred Baumgarten
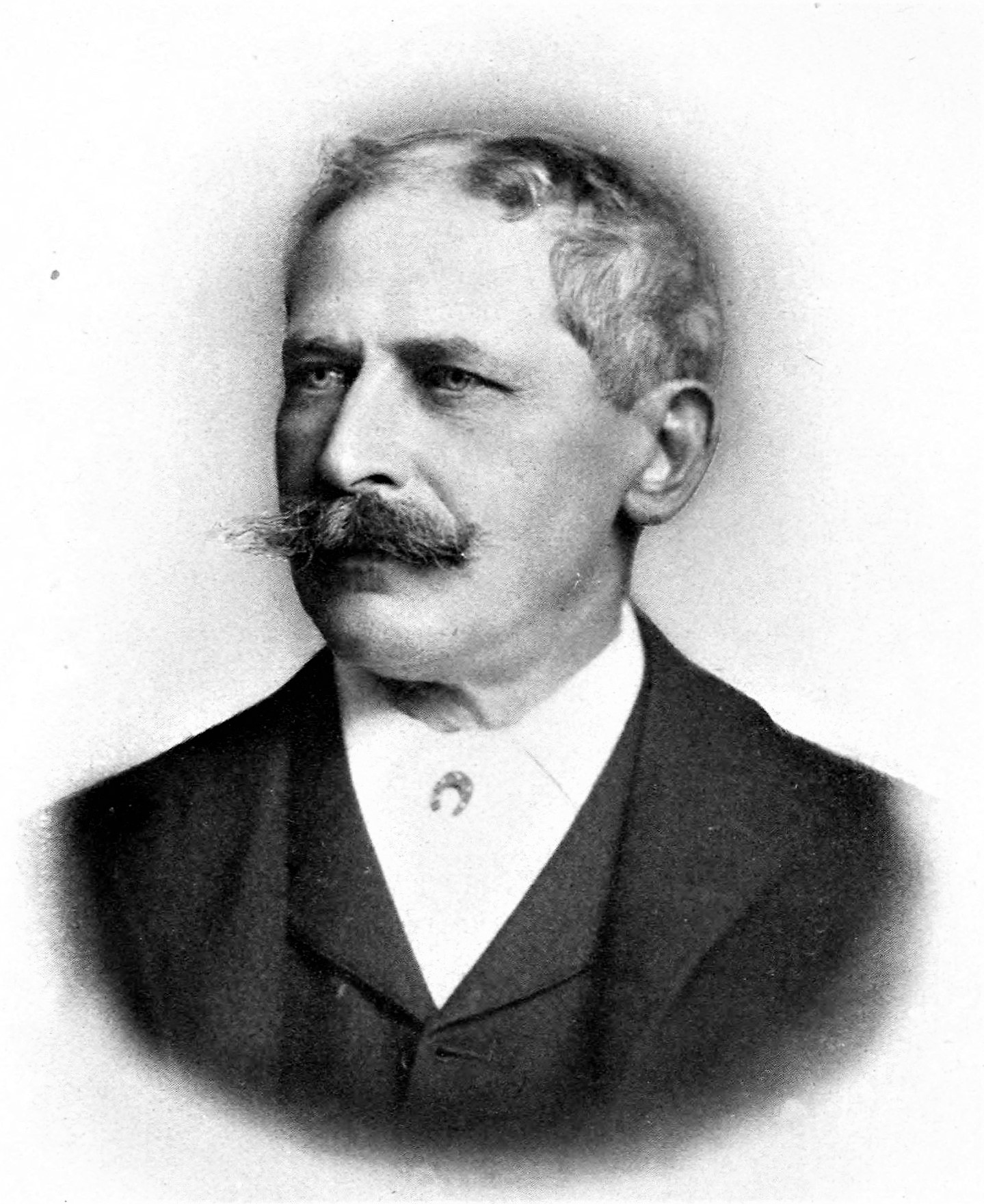
- Born: 13 November 1842; Dresden, Germany
- Died: 3 October 1919 (aged 76); Montreal, Canada
- Occupation: Businessman
- Known for: Entrepreneur, chemistry

Baron Alfred Moritz Friedrich Baumgarten (13 November 1842 – 3 October 1919) was the co-founder and president of the St. Lawrence Sugar Refinery at Montreal, and a life governor of the Montreal General Hospital and Master of Foxhounds for the Montreal Hunt. His house in Montreal's Golden Square Mile is today home to the McGill University Faculty Club.

== Family and education ==
Alfred Moritz Friedrich Baumgarten was born on 13 November 1842 in Dresden, the son of Dr Moritz Friedrich Oswald Baumgarten, court physician to John, king of Saxony, and Emmy Zocher, a lady-in-waiting to Queen Carola of Saxony.

Baumgarten attended Dresden High School and Dresden Polytechnic School (where he graduated as a chemist), before studying chemistry at the University of Berlin and the University of Göttingen, during which time he received two years' practical experience at the chemical plant at Schöningen. In 1864, he was awarded a doctor of philosophy degree.

== Career ==
Baumgarten began his career as the manager of a sugar beet house at Hamersleben, remaining there until 1866, when he emigrated to the United States.

=== New York ===
Baumgarten came to New York with the intention of entering the North American chemical industry. He became an assistant in the laboratory of the chemist Charles F. Chandler of the New York School of Mines.

Whilst at the School of Mines, Baumgarten formed a business partnership with C.W. Walter, establishing with him the Laurel Hill Chemical Works, under the name of Walter & Baumgarten. The company later became the Nicholson Company, the largest acid manufacturing works in North America. Baumgarten then moved from the company, when he obtained a management post at the Long Island Sugar refinery.

=== Montreal ===
In 1873, Baumgarten came to Montreal, where he worked as manager of the de Castro Syrup Company. In 1879, he co-founded the St. Lawrence Sugar Refining Company, becoming the company's vice-president and, in 1894, its president.

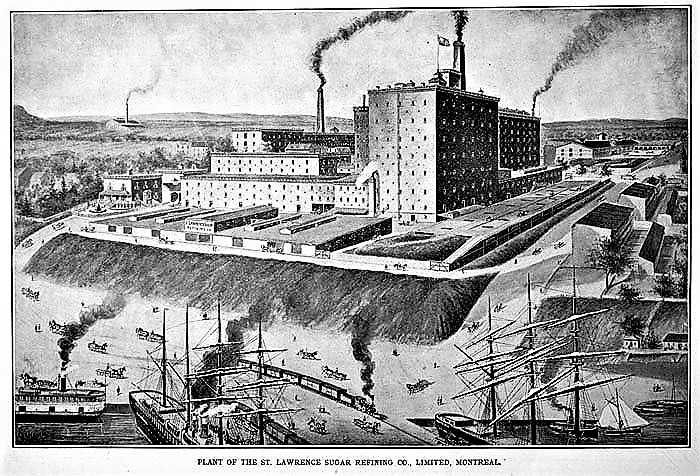
The St. Lawrence Sugar Refining Company, Montreal, depicted in 1903

Baumgarten's training as a chemical engineer enabled him to develop the process of refining sugar beet. The company imported raw sugar from the British West Indies and Europe before refining it into a pure substance. The plant was enlarged several times to accommodate the growth in demand. When the original buildings were destroyed by fire in 1887, a new factory was built at Maisonneuve on a riverside site that allowed the largest ships to unload their cargo near to the factory doors.

By 1908, the company was worth CA$5 million (1908) (equivalent to CA$148.9 million or US$106.51 million in 2025) and was exporting 300,000 barrels a year. Baumgarten became a wealthy man as a result of his stakes in the company.

In 1911, Baumgarten was appointed as a director of the Bank of Montreal. He was also a director of C. Meredith & Company; vice-president of the Montreal Archaeological Institute, and published several essays on chemistry. He retired in 1912 and was succeeded as president of the St. Lawrence Refinery by John Wilson McConnell, though he remained the principal shareholder and was given the position of honorary president.

=== Forced resignation from the St. Lawrence Sugar Refining Company ===
Prior to the First World War, anti-German sentiment spread through the British Empire, reaching a peak after the outbreak of war in 1914. The St. Lawrence Sugar Refinery was targeted in the local press for allegedly still being "in the hands of enemy Germans". By 1915, McConnell was forced to hold a shareholders' meeting to discuss "the serious menace to the welfare of our business caused by hostile publications in the press against certain persons connected with our company". The company decided that every officeholder with a German-sounding name had to resign his post, and most did. As well as being made to sell his shares, Baumgarten and his brother-in-law, the vice-president and managing director, Otto Wilhelm Donner, all resigned their positions.

These events, as well as the way several of his pre-war associates shunned him as soon as war was declared against Germany, distressed Baumgarten greatly. Some of his close friends stood by him, frustrated by how he had been treated.

During the war, Baumgarten contributed generously towards the Canadian Patriotic Fund, and he offered to let his Montreal town house become a convalescent home for disabled soldiers. However, aspersions were cast that he was a sympathiser and, stories were told that the house was used by the spy Joachim von Ribbentrop.

== Family and private life ==
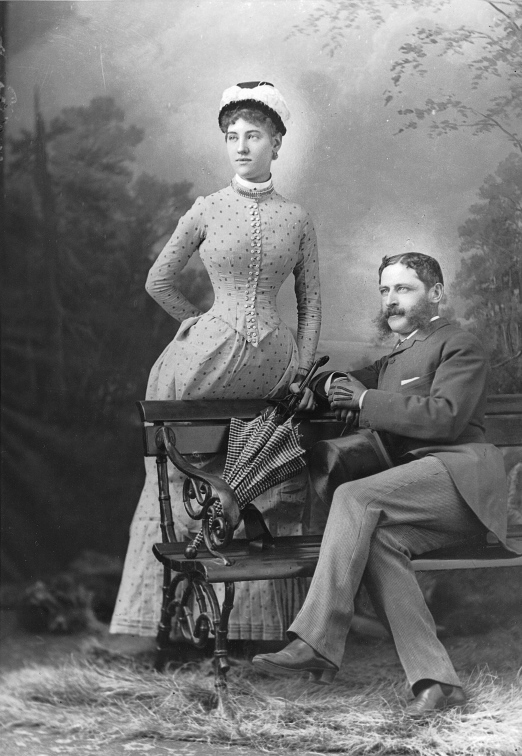
Alfred and Martha Baumgarten in 1885

In 1885, Baumgarten married Martha Christina Donner, the daughter of John Donner of Altona, Hamburg. The marriage produced two daughters, Mimi Donner Baumgarten (b. 1888), and Elsa Baumgarten (b. 1900). (Note: Elsa Baumgarten married Reginald Leslie Gault, a first cousin of Brigadier-General Andrew Hamilton Gault, of Montreal, who raised Princess Patricia's Canadian Light Infantry.) In 1895, he purchased a large house at Sainte-Agathe-des-Monts, which eventually had stables and galleries and dominated the hillside overlooking the lake.

Baumgarten was a life governor of the Montreal General Hospital, the Montreal Western Hospital and the Alexandra Hospital. He enjoyed a prominent place in Montreal's social world. After he retired from public life he spent the greater part of his time at his country house. He died on 3 October 1919, having been in poor health during the last five years of his life. He was buried in the Mount Royal Cemetery in Montreal.

Baumgarten died a wealthy man. In his will, executed in 1919, he left donations to the three hospitals where he had been a governor, and a substantial annual sum for his family, which allowed them to retain the family country house, even after Martha Baumgarten's death in 1953.

== Baumgarten House ==
In 1880, Baumgarten purchased land on McTavish Street, now located within Montreal's Golden Square Mile for a new mansion, Baumgarten House, which was completed in 1887.

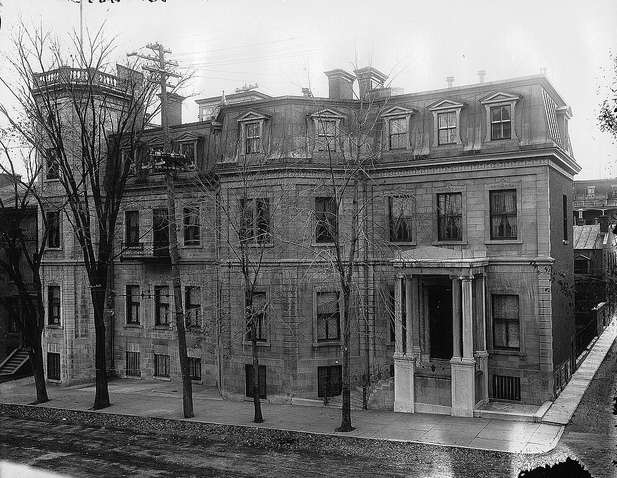
The Baumgartens' Montreal home

The house had a modest exterior, but the interior was sumptuously decorated and boasted a 'sunken bathtub' (an indoor swimming pool), the first in the city. It was also the first private residence to be fitted with electrical lighting. In 1902 he made further extensions to his home.

The ceiling of the ballroom, from which hung several chandeliers, was supported by marble columns and a minstrels' gallery was suspended from the ceiling with brass cords. The ballroom floor was built on springs to help boost the dancers' feet. Baumgarten personally designed and built the spring floor, which was transplanted to his home from the Montreal Hunt clubhouse when the Hunt relocated.

The Gothic Gallery, which spanned two stories of the house, was designed to resemble a German hunting lodge and was covered by an immense, amber-coloured stained glass skylight. In the early 1900s his home was the favourite Montreal place for Governor-General the Earl of Minto.

After Baumgarten's death in 1919, the house continued to be lived in by his widow and their two daughters. In 1926, McGill University purchased the house for a nominal sum to serve as a residence for the principal of McGill. General Sir Arthur Currie occupied the house until 1935, but it was felt by his successor that the house was too grand for his needs and from 1935 the house was renovated to become the McGill Faculty Club. At this time, the Gothic Gallery was split into two separate floors, the lower of which is now the main dining room, and the upper of which serves as the billiard room.

== Montreal Hunt ==
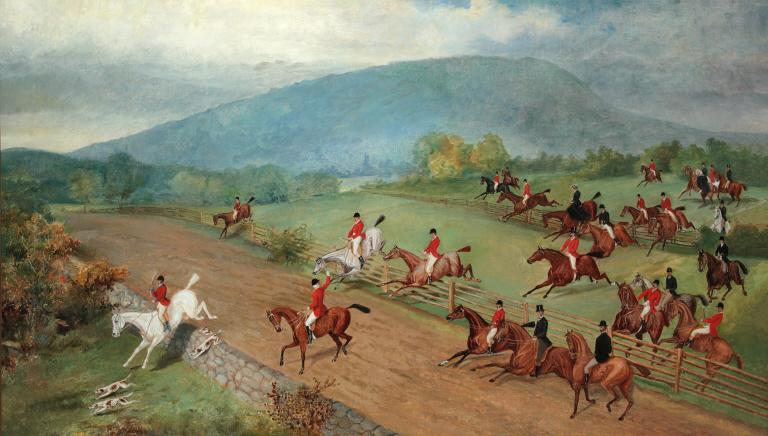
Alfred Baumgarten Full Cry (1877), McCord Stewart Museum

Baumgarten was an ardent sportsman and had a passion for horses. From 1882 to 1887, he was the Master of Foxhounds for the Montreal Hunt, rejuvenating the club after the departure of British troops from Canada in 1870. He introduced dinners and dancing after the meet.

In 1881, Baumgarten bought some land on the corner of what is today Mount Royal Avenue and Delormier Avenue.He commissioned the building of new kennels and a clubhouse, that included a banquet room, a billiards room, a ballroom, a swimming pool and a library. The front of the clubhouse featured a long gallery, where the meet could be viewed. The interior was decorated in light oak with burnished brass. The fireplace in the entrance hall was decorated with Dutch tiles depicting hunting scenes. The swimming pool was described as "an oriental plunge bathroom all inlaid with white tiles".

== Sources ==
- Fong, William (2008). J.W. McConnell: Financier, Philanthropist, Patriot. Montreal: McGill-Queen's University Press. ISBN 978-07735-3-270-0.
- Rémillard, François (1987). Mansions of the Golden Square Mile, Montreal, 1850-1930. Montreal; Quebec: Meridian Press. ISBN 2920417258.
- Sulte, Benjamin (1908). A History of Quebec: Its Resources and People. Vol. 2. Montreal: The Canada History Company. OCLC 28295618.
- Wood, William (1931). The Storied Province of Quebec: Past and Present. Vol. 3. Toronto: Dominion Publishing Company. OCLC 1151344370.

=== Published works ===
- Baumgarten, Alfred (1876). Industrial Canada: the duty of development and how to accomplish it. Montreal: Gazette. ISBN 978-06652-4-069-0.
