= Henry Bogart =

American surveyor, soldier, alderman (1729–1821)

Henry (Hendrick) Isaac Bogart was born October 1729 in Albany, New York and died in 1821. He was the eldest son of Albany residents Isaac and Hendrickie Oothout Bogert. He signed the Sons of Liberty Constitution in 1766. Henry Bogart was elected in 1775 to represent the first ward on the Albany Committee of Correspondence and served on that board throughout its existence. In 1776, he signed the "General Association".

He served as a constable and in 1761 he was first elected assistant alderman for the first ward section of the city of Albany. Several months after being sworn in as Albany's first official surveyor in 1766, he was elected alderman a post he served for several years. Bogart skippered a sloop called the Magdeline in 1776. By that time, he was drawing maps for the city of Albany and private clients. On March 21, 1791, Henry Bogart was appointed by George Washington to the post of Inspector of the revenue of the Port of Albany.

== Sources ==
- http://www.nysm.nysed.gov/albany/bios/b/hebogert6097.html
- http://www.jerseyhistory.org/findingaid.php?aid=1077
- http://www.albany.edu/history/eoah/entries/b/bogert_hendrick_i.htm
- https://web.archive.org/web/20080516031023/http://www.fortklock.com/namesalbany.htm
