= Harold Baumgartner =

South African cricketer (1883–1938)

Cricket information
- Batting: Right-handed
- Bowling: Slow left-arm orthodox

International information
- National side: South Africa
- Only Test: 13 December 1913 v England

Career statistics
Competition	Test	First-class
Matches	1	14
Runs scored	19	173
Batting average	9.50	7.86
100s/50s	0/0	0/0
Top score	16	21*
Balls bowled	166	2,737
Wickets	2	70
Bowling average	49.50	20.21
5 wickets in innings	0	6
10 wickets in match	0	2
Best bowling	2/99	8/109
Catches/stumpings	1/–	9/–
- Source: CricketArchive, 14 November 2022

Harold Vane Baumgartner (17 November 1883 – 8 April 1938), was a South African cricketer who was born in Henley-on-Thames, Oxfordshire, England, educated at Bedford School, and died in Accra, Gold Coast. He played in one Test in 1913.
