= Philippe Bogaert =

Belgian television producer

- Gender: male

Philippe Bogaert (born 1971) is a Belgian entrepreneur and ice-cream producer. He is the founder of Ralph & Roxy’s, a Belgian artisanal ice-cream brand based in Walloon Brabant, Belgium. In 2026, the company received wider media attention after Brussels Airlines introduced Ralph & Roxy’s ice cream on its long-haul flights.

== Career ==
Bogaert received press coverage in 2009 for claiming that he was being kept "hostage" in Qatar. Bogaert managed to escape Qatar by sailboat and fled to Europe.

=== Ralph & Roxy’s ===
Bogaert founded Ralph & Roxy’s, an artisanal ice-cream company based in Nodebais, in Walloon Brabant. Belgian media described the business as a small-scale venture that developed into a professional brand.

In April 2026, Brussels Airlines announced that Ralph & Roxy’s ice cream would be served on its long-haul flights. According to the airline, the collaboration involved around 420,000 jars annually. Belgian and aviation-sector media subsequently reported on the partnership.

=== Publications ===
Bogaert is also the author of Exit Permit! (2011).
