= Gaston Bogaert =

Belgian painter (1918–2008)

Gaston Bogaert (1918 in Le Mans – 2008 in Etterbeek) was a Belgian painter.

Bogaert was a surrealist painter. He uses symbols and unreal images to create a romantic and upsetting mood.

- Museum: Cagnes-sur-Mer, Verviers, Charleroi, Sint-Martens-Latem, Antwerp, Brasília, Rockefeller Art Center of New York City, Victoria Art Gallery in Canada and Tel Aviv
- Exhibitions: Brussels, Lille, Knokke, Sint-Martens-Latem, Mons, Antwerp, Basel, Paris, Cologne, Hauterive, Cannes, The Hague, Athens, Luxembourg, Turin, Ostend, Mechelen, Lokeren, Liège, Strasbourg, Clermont-Ferrand and Annecy
- Awards: Fantastic and fantasy award (Belgium) for best artist at the 1978 Eurocon in Brussels, Belgium
