= Baumgart =

Baumgart is a surname. Notable people with the surname include:

- Anna Baumgart (born 1966), Polish artist
- Bernd Baumgart (born 1955), German rower who competed for East Germany in the 1976 Summer Olympics
- Emílio Henrique Baumgart (1889–1943), Brazilian engineer
- James Baumgart (born 1938), former American member of the Wisconsin State Assembly and the Wisconsin State Senate
- Lloyd R. Baumgart (1908–1985), former American member of the Wisconsin State Assembly
- Steffen Baumgart (born 1972), German football player and manager
- Tom Baumgart (born 1997), German footballer
- Iga Baumgart-Witan (born 1989), Polish sprinter who specializes in the 400 meter dash
- Dennis Baumgart (born 1995), Swedish Olympic lifter, silver Swedish championship 2015

== See also ==
- Baumgarten (surname)
