= George Bogart =

American painter and art professor (1933 - 2005)

- Born: October 30, 1933; Duluth, Minnesota, U.S.
- Died: November 23, 2005 (aged 72); Norman, Oklahoma, U.S.

Academic background
- Education: University of Minnesota Duluth (BFA); University of Washington (MFA)

Academic work
- Discipline: Art
- Sub-discipline: Painting
- Institutions: University of Texas at Austin; Pennsylvania State University; University of Oklahoma

George Allen Bogart (October 30, 1933 – November 23, 2005) was an American painter and art professor. He taught at the University of Texas at Austin, Pennsylvania State University, and University of Oklahoma.

== Early life and education ==
Bogart was born in Duluth, Minnesota. He earned a Bachelor of Fine Arts degree from the University of Minnesota Duluth in 1956 and a Master of Fine Arts from the University of Washington in 1959.

== Career ==
Prior to joining the University of Oklahoma as a full professor, Bogart taught art at the University of Texas in Austin for eight years and Pennsylvania State University for three years. In 1970, he accepted a one-year guest artist position at the University of California, Berkeley.
