= Bogaard =

Bogaard is a surname. Notable people with the surname include:

- Adriana Bogaard, Canadian film and theatrical set and costume designer
- Amy Bogaard, Canadian archaeologist and professor
- Bill Bogaard (born 1938), American politician

== See also ==
- Boogaard
