= Federal Planning Bureau =

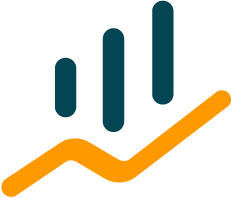
- Headquarters: Brussels
- Commissioner: to be determined
- Website: plan.be

The Federal Planning Bureau (FPB) is a Belgian independent public agency that carries out research and makes projections on economic, social and environmental policy issues. It also studies the integration of these policy issues within a context of sustainable development. On 25 November 2023, the Council of Ministers approved a draft royal decree appointing Baudouin Regout as the new Commissioner of the FPB. The Commissioner is assisted by the Deputy Commissioner, Saskia Weemaes.

== History ==
When the FPB was founded on 14 October 1959, it carried the name of Programming Bureau. Its mission was to elaborate the economic policy framework, which had been absent until then, by submitting proposals to the Ministerial Committee for Economic and Social Coordination. In 1970, the Programming Bureau’s name was changed into Planning Bureau, in accordance with the law of 15 July of that same year. The economic programmes are replaced by economic plans marked by a more formalized approach and regional components. From 1980 onward, the Planning Bureau abandoned its former approach and focused on the elaboration of economic medium-term projections and impact studies on different subjects. In 1994, in the wake of the fourth Belgian state reform, the Planning Bureau’s name was once more changed into the Federal Planning Bureau. From then on, the Bureau would also be charged with forecasts for the government budget.

== Role ==
=== Missions and activities ===
Most of the FPB’s activities are legally defined. Other studies are made at the request of the government, social partners and parliament. The FPB can also undertake projects at its own initiative or within the framework of research contracts with third parties.

The activities of the FPB are centered around four axes:

1. Outlook
  - Short-term economic forecasts used by the federal government to draw up its budget;
  - 5-year outlooks for the Belgian economy in its international context. Those outlooks analyse, in particular, the future of the main branches of industry, of employment and of public finances;
  - Long-term projections of the demographic evolution of our society and of the financial consequences of population-ageing;
  - Projections on energy consumption and production, as well as greenhouse gas emissions.
  - Projections on transport evolution.
2. Assessments
  - Evaluation of the economic and social effects of policy measures such as a cut in social security contributions, of shocks like an increase in oil prices and of macroeconomic or structural trends such as the acceleration of technological progress;
  - Regular and integrated assessments of the interests involved in and policies on sustainable development.
3. Research
  - Decision-making tools supporting the federal mobility and transport policy;
  - Innovative themes in collaboration with Belgian and foreign research institutions, as well as participation in the activities of international organizations such as the European Commission, the OECD and the IMF.
4. Statistics and economic modelling
  - Elaboration of economic models: NIME, NEMESIS, MODTRIM, MALTESE, HERMREG, HERMES, LABMOD, MIDAS, PRIMES, PROMETHEUS, PLANET;
  - Economic, social and environmental indicators and statistical descriptions of the Belgian economy such as input-output tables, environmental accounts and transport accounts.

=== Research areas ===
The FPB makes projections and evaluates past or intended policy in the following areas:

- Macroeconomic forecasting, projections and analyses
- Regional economy
- International economy
- Labour market
- Public finances
- Social protection and ageing
- Population
- Energy, transport and mobility
- Productivity and long-term growth
- Regulation and globalization
- Sectoral and intersectoral analyses
- Sustainable development

=== Publications ===
All the FPB’s studies are published, presented publicly and widely distributed. The recurring publications, which relate to the FPB’s main legal assignments, include:

- Economic budget (Institute for National Accounts [INA]);
- Medium-term economic outlook (FPB);
- Medium-term outlook preparatory to the government’s Stability programme (BFP);
- Ageing Report (Study Committee on Ageing [SCA]);
- National Reform Programme (governments);
- Prospective studies for electricity and natural gas (FPS Economy, S.M.E.s, Self-employed and Energy – FPB);
- Development plan for the electricity transmission system (transmission system operator, FPS Economy, S.M.E.s, Self-employed and Energy – FPB);
- Input-output tables (INA);
- Environmental Accounts (FPB);
- Federal report on sustainable development (FPB);
- Transport indicators, transport satellite accounts and transport simulations (FPB);
- Population forecasts (FPB – Directorate-General of Statistics and Economic Information [DGSEI]);
- Mortality tables (FPB).

The organizations and commissions mentioned in parentheses are responsible for the final publication.

== List of commissioners of the Federal Planning Bureau since its founding ==
1. Albert Kervyn de Lettenhove (1959–1966)
2. Claude Josz (1966–1969)
3. Robert Maldague (1969–1991)
4. Henri Bogaert (1992–2014)
5. Philippe Donnay (2014–2021)
6. Saskia Weemaes (2021–2023)
7. Baudoin Regout (2023–present)
