= Bogard Township =

Bogard Township may refer to one of the following places in the United States:

- Bogard Township, Daviess County, Indiana
- Bogard Township, Henry County, Missouri
