= Bortle scale =

Scale for measuring the brightness of the night sky

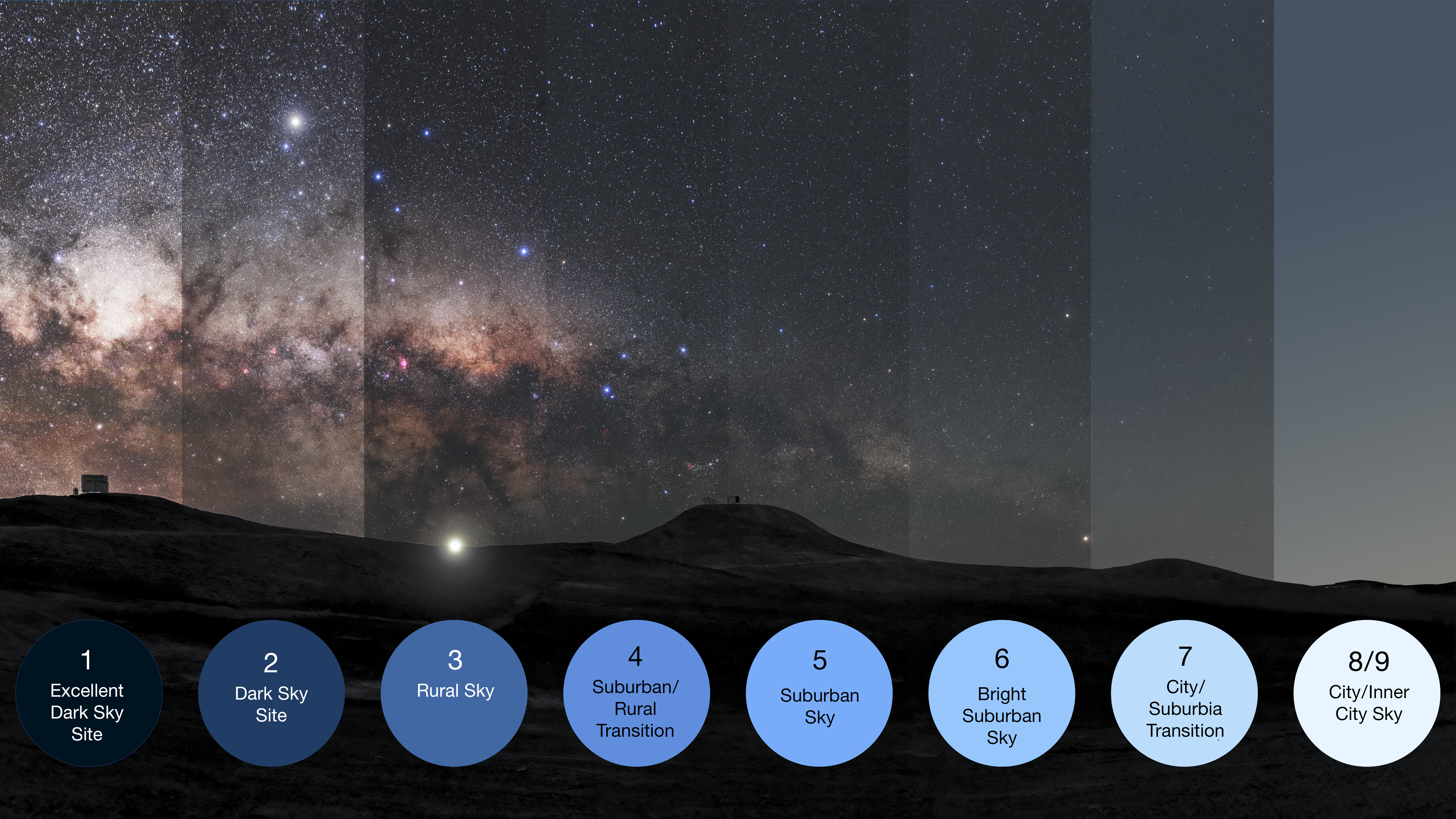
Representation of the Bortle scale

The Bortle dark-sky scale (usually referred to as simply the Bortle scale) is a nine-level numeric scale that measures the night sky's brightness of a particular location. It characterizes the observability of celestial objects, taking into account the interference caused by light pollution. Amateur astronomer John E. Bortle created the scale and published it in the February 2001 edition of Sky & Telescope magazine to help skywatchers evaluate and compare the darkness of night-sky observing sites.

== Scale ==
The scale ranges from Class 1, the darkest skies available on Earth, through to Class 9, inner-city skies. The classes are described primarily in terms of the visibility of notable celestial objects and light sources in the sky, but correspond closely with naked-eye limiting magnitude (NELM) and sky quality meter (SQM) measurement of skyglow. At higher classes, light pollution above the horizon is obvious, diffuse light sources such as the Milky Way and Messier objects are invisible to the naked eye, and fewer point light sources such as stars and planets can be seen. At lower classes, light pollution domes are only present in the direction of cities or are absent altogether, the sky is filled with stars, and faint diffuse light sources such as the zodiacal light are contrastful and brilliant.

== Table of dark-sky classifications ==
Bortle's descriptions of the classes are summarized in the table.

Class	Title	NELM	Approx. SQM mag/arcsec^{2}	Description
1	Excellent dark-sky site	7.6 – 8.0	21.76 – 22.0	The zodiacal light is visible and colorful.; The gegenschein is readily visible.; The zodiacal band is visible.; Airglow is readily visible.; The Scorpius and Sagittarius regions of the Milky Way cast obvious shadows.; Many constellations, particularly fainter ones, are barely recognizable amid the large number of stars.; Many Messier and globular clusters are naked-eye objects.; M33 (the Triangulum Galaxy) is a direct vision naked-eye object.; Limiting magnitude with 32 cm (12.5 in) reflector is 17.5 (with effort).; Venus and Jupiter affect dark adaptation.; Neptune may theoretically be visible using averted vision with fully adapted eyes, though no one has ever seen it with the naked eye.
2	Typical truly dark site	7.1 – 7.5	21.6 – 21.75	The zodiacal light is distinctly yellowish and bright enough to cast shadows at dusk and dawn.; Airglow may be weakly visible near horizon.; The gegenschein is visible.; Clouds are only visible as dark holes against the sky.; Surroundings are barely visible silhouetted against the sky.; The summer Milky Way is highly structured.; Many Messier objects and globular clusters are naked-eye objects.; M33 is easily seen with naked eye.; Limiting magnitude with 32 cm reflector is 16.5.
3	Rural sky	6.6 – 7.0	21.3 – 21.6	The zodiacal light is striking in spring and autumn, and color is still visible.; Some light pollution evident at the horizon.; Clouds are illuminated near the horizon, dark overhead.; Nearer surroundings are vaguely visible.; The summer Milky Way still appears complex.; The globular clusters M15, M4, M5, and M22 are naked-eye objects.; M33 is easily visible with averted vision.; Limiting magnitude with 32 cm reflector is 16.
4	Brighter rural	6.3 – 6.5	20.8 – 21.3	The zodiacal light is still visible, but does not extend halfway to the zenith at dusk or dawn.; Light pollution domes visible in several directions.; Clouds are illuminated in the directions of the light sources, dark overhead.; Surroundings are clearly visible, even at a distance.; The Milky Way well above the horizon is still impressive, but lacks detail.; M33 is a difficult averted vision object, only visible when high in the sky.; Limiting magnitude with 32 cm reflector is 15.5.
4.5	Semi-Suburban/ Transition sky	6.1 – 6.3	20.3 – 20.8	Clouds have a grayish glow at zenith and appear bright in the direction of one or more prominent city light domes.; The Milky Way is only vaguely visible 10 – 15 degrees above the horizon. However, the Great Rift, when overhead and with good transparency, is still obvious.; The Andromeda Galaxy's dust lane spans roughly twice the diameter of the core, appearing as a hazy gray line. Additionally, this dust lane is featured about 1.5 times farther out from the core's radius.; While the Orion Nebula's wings are dim, they are easier to detect than the dust lanes in Andromeda.; M44, an open star cluster, can be difficult to detect near the horizon; around 30 stars are visible through binoculars at its highest.; Limiting magnitude with 32 cm reflector is 15.2.
5	Suburban sky	5.6 – 6.0	19.25 – 20.3	Only hints of zodiacal light are seen on the best nights in autumn and spring.; Light pollution is visible in most, if not all, directions.; Clouds are noticeably brighter than the sky.; The Milky Way is invisible near the horizon, and looks washed out overhead. The winter Milky Way, even directly overhead, is fairly subtle.; Limiting magnitude with 32 cm reflector is 15.
6	Bright suburban sky	5.1 – 5.5	18.5 – 19.25	The zodiacal light is invisible.; Light pollution makes the sky within 35° of the horizon glow grayish white.; Clouds anywhere in the sky appear fairly bright.; Even high clouds (cirrus) appear brighter than the sky background.; Surroundings are easily visible.; The Milky Way is only visible near the zenith.; The core of M31 appears noticeably brighter from Bortle 7.; See Bortle 4.5 note for M44.; M33 appears as bright as Andromeda between Bortle 7–8 skies.; Limiting magnitude with 32 cm reflector is 14.5.; When viewed with binoculars, some stars appear as bright as Bortle 7 planets.
7	Suburban/urban transition	4.6 – 5.0	18.00 – 18.5	Light pollution makes the entire sky light gray.; Strong light sources are evident in all directions.; Clouds are brightly lit.; The Milky Way is nearly or totally invisible, resembling a cloud.; The core of M31 appears barely brighter from Bortle 8.; See Bortle 4.5 note for M44.; See Bortle 6 note for M33.; Through a telescope, the brightest Messier objects are pale ghosts of their true selves.; Limiting magnitude with 32 cm reflector is 14.
8	City sky	4.1 – 4.5	< 18.00	The sky is light gray or orange – one can easily read.; Stars forming familiar constellation patterns may be weak or invisible.; See Bortle 6 note for M33.; Even with a telescope, only bright Messier objects can be detected.; Limiting magnitude with 32 cm reflector is 13.
9	Inner-city sky	≤ 4.0	< 18.00	Many stars forming constellations are invisible and many fainter constellations are invisible.; Aside from the Pleiades, no Messier object is visible to the naked eye.; The only objects to observe are the Moon, the planets, bright satellites, and a few of the brightest star clusters.; The most luminous stars and planets seem smaller than stars of magnitude 3 found in Bortle 7.

== Reception ==
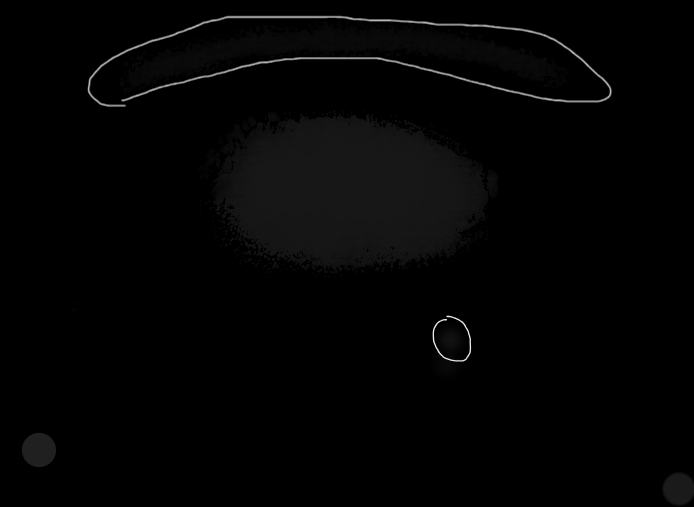
Sketch of M31 with M32 and dust lane under Bortle 4.5

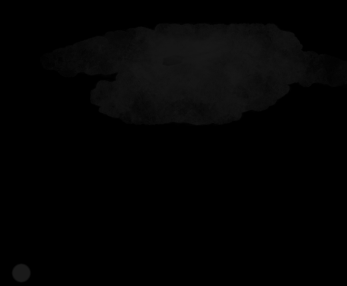
Sketch of M31 (Bortle 6)

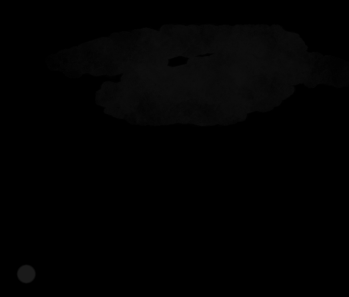
Sketch of M31 (Bortle 7)

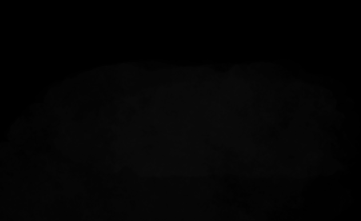
Sketch of M31 (Bortle 8)

The Bortle scale has attained widespread usage among amateur and professional astronomers. It quantifies the link between artificial lighting and reduced night sky quality in an intuitive manner, making it a common tool in scientific communication. A wide database of SQM measurements has been created, allowing the Bortle rating to be estimated for anywhere in the world.

Bortle was motivated to publish the scale in 2001 by increasing light pollution making true dark-sky sites inaccessible to many amateur astronomers. Ongoing urbanization and the global transition to LED lighting have continued this trend. James Brodrick of the US Department of Energy wrote in 2018 that "All manmade lighting is 'unnatural' and thus, has potentially undesirable side effects. Some of these are unavoidable if we're to continue to enjoy the benefits."

The higher light temperature of LED lights has been a particular contributor to increasing light pollution, in ways sometimes not reflected in older studies of light pollution. However, The Washington Post wrote in 2023 that "there is a world where more energy-efficient LED lights exist and don't significantly disrupt nightscapes or our health." DarkSky International calls for responsible outdoor lighting that is carefully targeted, no brighter than necessary, and warm-colored.

2014 research suggests Bortle may have overestimated the visibility of dim objects for the typical observer, even in the darkest skies. Diffuse light sources such as M33 are more difficult to see than point light sources of the same visual magnitude; Bortle's description of M33 (V 5.72) as a naked-eye object is atypical. A naked-eye limiting magnitude (NELM) over 7.1, which Bortle suggests for Class 2, represents a "substantial raising of achievement and expectation". A NELM of 6.0 to 6.5 is a more commonly cited figure. Bortle was aware of NELM varying with the visual acuity of the observer, and he devised the scale as an alternative to raw NELM.

== See also ==
- 4673 Bortle
- Amateur astronomy
- Dark-sky movement
- DarkSky International
- The End of Night (book)
- Light pollution
- Light Pollution Index
- Night sky
- Sky brightness
- Skyglow
- Sky & Telescope (S&T)

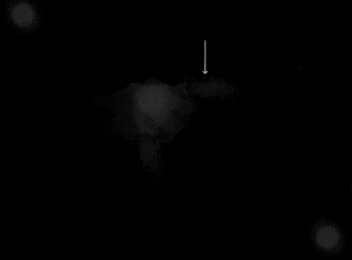
Sketch of M42 including wings under Bortle 4.5
