= Peter Baumgartner (businessman) =

Swiss businessman

- Born: Switzerland
- Title: Former CEO, Etihad Airways
- Term: May 2016 – December 2017

Peter Baumgartner is a Swiss businessman. Since 2018, he has served as senior strategic advisor to the CEO of Etihad Aviation Group. Baumgartner was formerly the CEO of Etihad Airways from May 2016 to December 2017.

== Career ==
Baumgartner was promoted to COO of Etihad in 2009.

In 2016, Baumgartner was named CEO of Etihad Airways, taking over the day-to-day operational running of the airline. He later became the acting CEO of Etihad Aviation Group in 2017, as the group faced losses from its investments in Air Berlin and Alitalia.

Baumgartner stated that, in May 2017, the partnership with the Special Olympics was a step forward for Etihad Avitation Group's social activities program.

In November 2017, Baumgartner announced that the removal of the Dallas route was one of several adjustments made by Etihad's U.S. network in 2018. The same month, Baumgartner denied that Etihad was looking for investment opportunities in various airlines. As part of a strategic review supported by Baumgartner in January 2018, five Airbus A330 freighters were replaced with Boeing 777 aircraft.

In April 2018, in his opening remarks at AVSEC World, Baumgartner revealed that the airline was offered a pre-clearance facility at Abu Dhabi International Airport. A month later, Etihad Airways upgraded its Paris flights to Airbus A380 aircraft, due to increased demand.

In July 2018, Tony Douglas took over as CEO of the Etihad Aviation Group, promoting Baumgartner to the position of special advisor.

In 2019, following the introduction of Plug and Play's Travel and Hospitality Accelerator program, Baumgartner attended the press conference in Abu Dhabi.

In February 2020, Baumgartner started as Senior Advisor for PA Consulting Group, where he heledp establish a new aviation advisory board.

== Personal life ==
Baumgartner was born in Switzerland. He is married, and a fellow of the Royal Aeronautical Society.

== Controversy ==
In July 2020, the Court of Arbitration for Sport (CAS), lifted UEFA's 2018 Manchester City ban from the Champions League for violation of its financial fair play rules and judging that City's Abu Dhabi ownership had unfairly sponsored the club by channeling money through the state's commercial companies passing them on as independent sponsorship. CAS found that "most of the alleged breaches were either not established or time-barred" and at the same time reduced the club's fine by two thirds. However according to Spiegel, there were doubts about the CAS verdict as it emerged that in December 2013 City director Simon Pearce had sent an email to Baumgartner, with the subject "Payments". In this further leaked email from Pearce, who was also a senior executive in an Abu Dhabi government authority, to Baumgartner, Etihad's chief commercial officer at the time, Pearce confirmed that he was "forwarding" the airline GBP 91 million of GBP 99 million that Etihad owed to the club for its sponsorship, with Etihad merely providing GBP 8 million.
