= Boogaard =

Boogaard is a Dutch surname. Notable people with the surname include:

- Aaron Boogaard (born 1986), professional Canadian ice hockey player
- Derek Boogaard (1982–2011), professional Canadian ice hockey player of the NHL
- Krysten Boogaard (born 1988), professional Canadian basketball forward
- Nigel Boogaard (born 1986), Australian soccer player

== See also ==
- Van den Boogaard
- Bogaard
