= Bogarde =

Bogarde is a surname. Notable people with the surname include:

- Sir Dirk Bogarde (1921–1999), English actor and novelist
- Lamare Bogarde (born 2004), Dutch footballer
- Melayro Bogarde (born 2002), Dutch footballer
- Winston Bogarde (born 1970), Dutch footballer
