= Light pollution (disambiguation) =

Light pollution is the presence of unwanted, inappropriate, or excessive artificial lighting in the visible spectrum. It may also refer to:

- Radio spectrum pollution
- Polarized light pollution, the form of light pollution specific to polarized light
- Ecological light pollution, the effect of artificial light on individual organisms and on the structure of ecosystems as a whole
- Light pollution in Hong Kong
- Light pollution in Hawaii
- Light pollution in China
- "Light Pollution", a song from the 2005 album Digital Ash in a Digital Urn
- "Light Pollution", a song from the 2026 album Solaris

== See also ==
- New England Light Pollution Advisory Group
