= Spectral G-index =

Variable to quantify the short wavelength light in a visible light source

The spectral G-Index is a variable that was developed to quantify the amount of short wavelength light in a visible light source relative to its visible emission (it is a measure of the amount of blue light per lumen). The smaller the G-index, the more blue, violet, or ultraviolet light a lamp emits relative to its total output. It is used in order to select outdoor lamps that minimize skyglow and ecological light pollution. The G-index was originally proposed by David Galadí Enríquez, an astrophysicist at Calar Alto Observatory.

== Definition ==
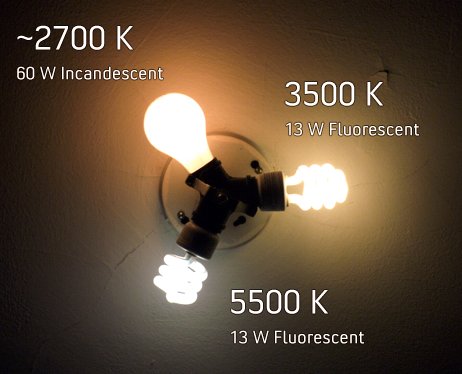
Lamps with very different color temperatures will usually also have different G-indexes. Lamps with higher color temperatures have more blue light, and will therefore usually have lower G-index.

The G-index is grounded in the system of astronomical photometry, and is defined as follows:

$$G=-2.5\mathrm{log}_{10}
\frac{\sum\limits _{\lambda=380 \mathrm{nm}} ^{500\mathrm{nm}} E(\lambda)}
{\sum\limits _{\lambda=380 \mathrm{nm}} ^{780\mathrm{nm}} E(\lambda)V(\lambda)}$$

where

- G is the spectral G-index;
- λ is the wavelength in nanometers;
- E is the spectral power distribution of the lamp;
- V(λ) is the luminosity function

The sums are to be taken using a step size of 1 nm. For lamps with absolutely no emissions below 500 nm (e.g. Low Pressure Sodium or PC Amber LED), the G-index would in principle be undefined. In practice, such lamps would be reported as having G greater than some value, due to the limits of measurement precision. The Regional Government of Andalusia has developed a spreadsheet to allow calculation of the G-index for any lamp for which the spectral power distribution is known, and it can also be calculated in the "Astrocalc" software or the f.luxometer web app.

The G-index does not directly measure light pollution, but rather says something about the color of light coming from a lamp. For example, since the equation defining G-index is normalised to total flux, if twice as many lamps are used, the G-index would not change; it is a measure of fractional light, not total light. Similarly, the definition of G-index does not include the direction in which light shines, so it is not directly related to skyglow, which depends strongly on direction.

== Rationale ==
The ongoing global switch from (mainly) orange high pressure sodium lamps for street lighting to (mainly) white LEDs has resulted in a shift towards broad spectrum light, with greater short wavelength (blue) emissions. This switch is problematic from the perspective of increased astronomical and ecological light pollution. Short wavelength light is more likely to scatter in the atmosphere, and therefore produces more artificial skyglow than an equivalent amount of longer wavelength light. Additionally, both broad spectrum (white) light and short wavelength light tend to have greater overall ecological impacts than narrow band and long wavelength visible light. For this reason, lighting guidelines, recommendations, norms, and legislation frequently place limits on blue light emissions. For example, the "fixture seal of approval" program of the International Dark-Sky Association limits lights to have a correlated color temperature (CCT) below 3000 K, while the national French light pollution law restricts CCT to maximum 3000 K in most areas, and 2400 K or 2700 K in protected areas such as nature reserves.

The problem with these approaches is that CCT is not perfectly correlated with blue light emissions. Lamps with identical CCT can have quite different fractional blue light emissions. This is because CCT is based upon comparison to a blackbody light source, which is a poor approximation for LEDs and vapor discharge lamps such as high pressure sodium. The G-index was therefore developed for use in decision making for the purchase of outdoor lamps and in lighting regulations as an improved alternative to the CCT metric.

== Use ==
In 2019, the European Commission's Joint Research Centre incorporated the G-index into their guidelines for the Green Public Procurement of road lighting. Specifically, in areas needing protection for astronomical or ecological reasons, they recommend the use of the G-index instead of CCT in making lighting decisions, because the G-index more accurately quantifies the amount of blue light. In their "core criteria", they recommend that "in parks, gardens and areas considered by the procurer to be ecologically sensitive, the G-index shall be ≥1.5". In the case that G-index could for some reason not be calculated, they suggest that CCT≤3000 K is likely to satisfy this criterion. In the stricter "comprehensive criteria", they recommend that parks and ecologically sensitive areas or areas at specified distances from optical astronomy observatories have a G-index greater than or equal to 2.0. Again, in this case if calculating the G-index is not possible, CCT≤2700 K is suggested.

The G-index is planned to be used by the Regional Government of Andalusia, specifically for the purpose of protecting the night sky. Depending on the "environmental zone", the regulation requires lighting to have a G value above 2, 1.5, or 1. In areas where astronomical activities are ongoing, it is expected that only monochromatic or quasi-monochromatic lamps will be used, with G>3.5 and in principle only emissions in the interval 585-605 nm.

== Questionable Use Warning ==
The G-index has not been evaluated or adopted by a standards development organization (SDO), such as the CIE. Many regulations on light pollution include limitations (spectral, or other kind) based on parameters defined and specified by the regulators themselves, not needing the support of any public or private standard development organization. There is no obligation in Spanish, European or international law, in the sens of using only SDO defined parameters for regulations or tenders. Thus, it is not questionable for the EC Joint Research Center and the Andalusian Regional Government (and others) to suggest or prescribe mandatory requirements based on the G-index.

It is true that a measure focused solely on reducing blue light will not provide ecological protection. Blue light limitation is only one dimension of the problem. Because the intensity of light plays a role as strong or stronger than spectrum, putting the light in the right places (on road surfaces and sidewalks) and avoiding spillage into ecological regions is likely to be more effective than manipulating the spectrum of the light. Spectrum does play a role, but in order to prevent disturbance to sensitive animals, changes must be made to the spectrum which cannot be described by the G-index. Those changes are also species dependent. A specific (red-dominant) spectrum has been proven to be as good as darkness for many (but not all) light sensitive insect and bat species. An amber spectrum is proven to be less eco-friendly than a red spectrum for some species, although both have negligible blue content and 'favorable' G index. However, in the cases in which the regulation wants to limit the amount of blue light, using a blue-light metric, such as the G index, is clearly more specific and meaningful than just using CCT, as it is currently done in many regulations.
