= Ecological light pollution =

Effect of artificial light on ecosystems

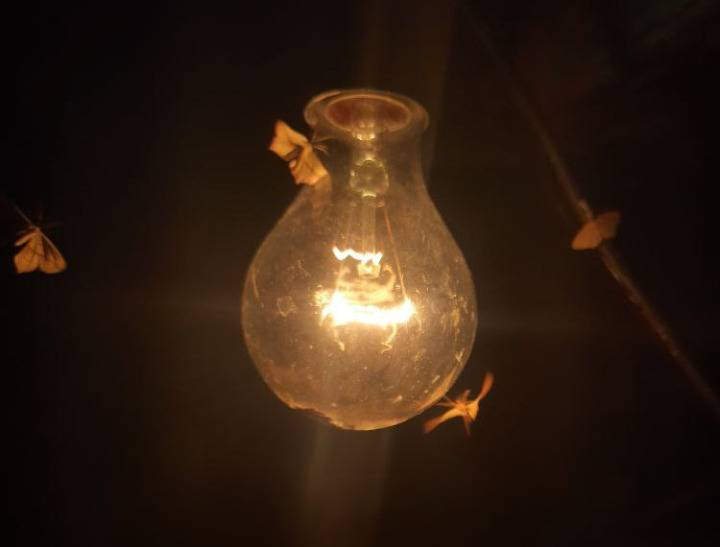
Moths circling an electric lightbulb

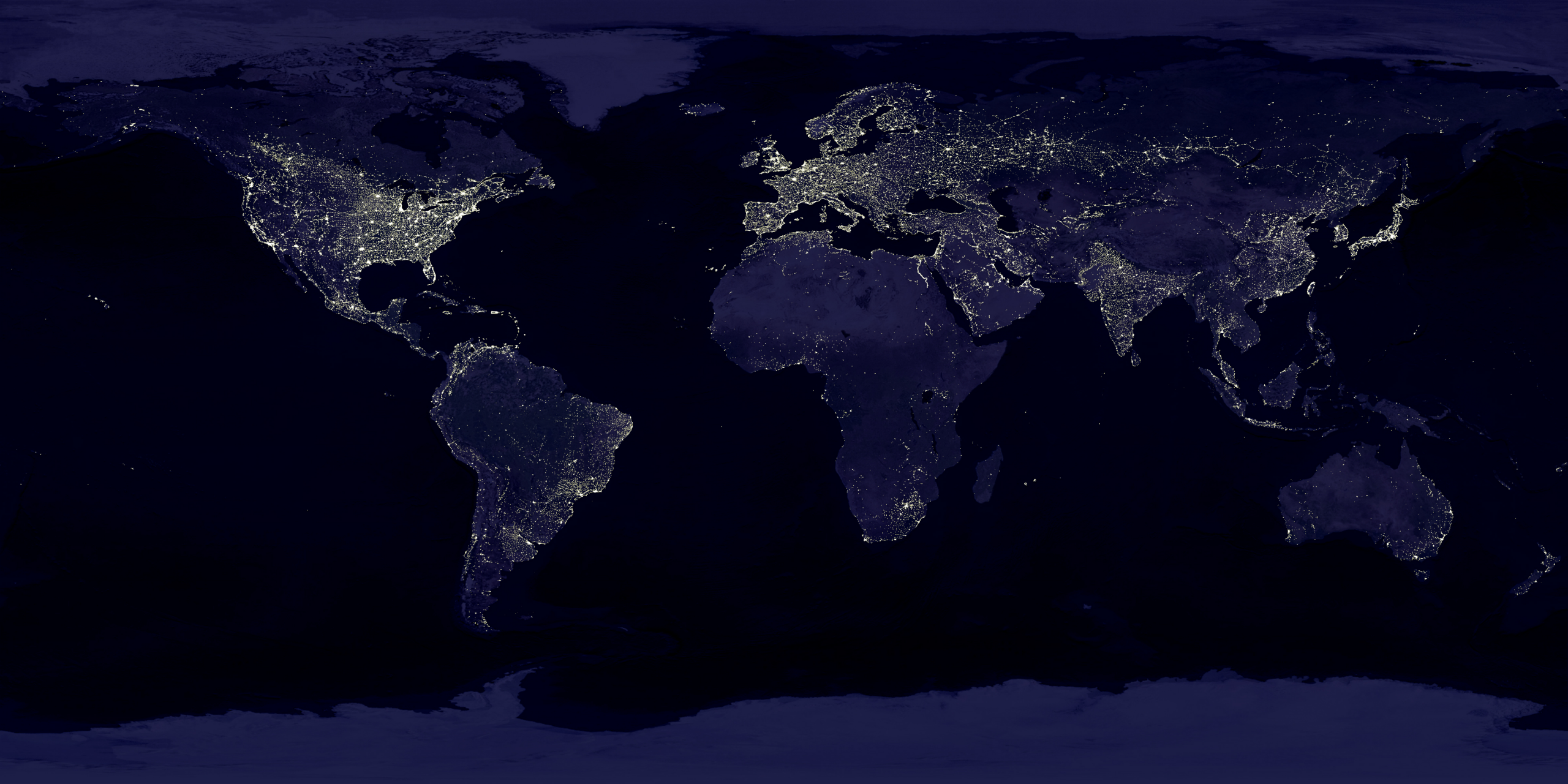
A composite satellite image of the Earth at night. Few naturally dark areas remain on the land surface of the Earth.

Ecological light pollution is the effect of artificial light on individual organisms and on the structure of ecosystems as a whole.

The effect that artificial light has upon organisms is highly variable, and ranges from beneficial (e.g. increased ability for predator species to observe prey) to immediately fatal (e.g. moths that are attracted to incandescent lanterns and are killed by the heat). It is also possible for light at night to be both beneficial and damaging for a species. As an example, humans benefit from using indoor artificial light to extend the time available for work and play, but the light disrupts the human circadian rhythm, and the resulting stress is damaging to health.

Through the various effects that light pollution has on individual species, the ecology of regions is affected. In the case where two species occupy an identical niche, the population frequency of each species may be changed by the introduction of artificial light if they are not equally affected by light at night. For example, some species of spiders avoid lit areas, while other species willingly build webs directly on lamp posts. Since lamp posts attract many flying insects, the spiders that tolerate light gain an advantage over the spiders that avoid it, and may become more dominant in the environment as a result. Changes in these species frequencies can then have knock-on effects, as the interactions between these species and others in the ecosystem are affected and food webs are altered. These ripple effects can eventually affect diurnal plants and animals. As an example, changes in the activity of night active insects can change the survival rates of night blooming plants, which may provide food or shelter for diurnal animals.

The introduction of artificial light at night is one of the most drastic anthropogenic changes to the Earth, comparable to toxic pollution, land use change, and climate change due to increases in the concentration of green house gases.

== Natural light cycles ==
The introduction of artificial light disrupts several natural light cycles that arise from the movements of the Earth, Moon, and Sun, as well as from meteorological factors.

=== Diurnal (solar) cycle ===
The most obvious change in introducing light at night is the end of darkness in general. The day/night cycle, or diurnal cycle, is probably the most powerful environmental behavioral signal, as almost all animals can be categorized as nocturnal or diurnal. If a nocturnal animal is only active in extreme dark, it will be unable to survive in lit areas. The most acute affects are directly next to streetlights and lit buildings, but the diffuse light of skyglow can extend out to hundreds of kilometers away from city centres. The day/night cycle has even been shown to have an impact on blind creatures. Roughly one quarter of fully-blind individuals are in sync with the day/night cycle.

=== Seasonal (solar) cycles ===
The axial tilt of the Earth results in seasons outside of the tropics. The change in the length of the day, or photoperiod, is the key signal for seasonal behavior (e.g. mating season) in non-tropical animals and plants. The presence of light at night can result in "seasons out of time", changing the behavior, thermoregulation, and hormonal functioning of affected organisms. This may result in a disconnect between body functioning and seasonality, causing disruptions to reproduction, dormancy, and migration.

=== Lunar cycles ===
The behavior of some animals (e.g. coyotes, bats, toads, insects) is keyed to the lunar cycle. Near city centers the level of skyglow often exceeds that of the full moon, so the presence of light at night can alter these behaviors, potentially reducing fitness. Experiments performed by biologists have also linked changes in the circadian rhythms of nocturnal animals to the presence of artificial light at night (ALAN).

=== Cloud coverage ===
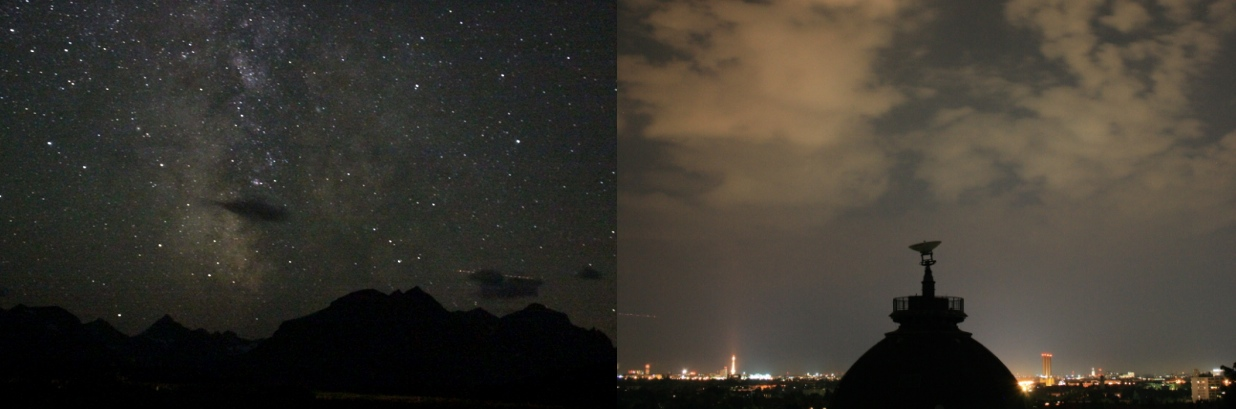
The impact of clouds on light levels in urban and suburban ecosystems is completely reversed from what occurs in pristine areas.

In pristine areas, clouds blot out the stars and darken the night sky, resulting in the darkest possible nights. In urban and suburban areas, in contrast, clouds enhance the effect of skyglow, particularly for longer wavelengths. This means that the typical level of light is much higher near cities, but it also means that truly dark nights never occur in these areas.

This also means that the night sky is becoming increasingly less visible in certain areas, especially large cities. It has been noted that worldwide, the night sky is becoming 10% less visible each year.

== Effects on organisms ==
=== Terrestrial ===
Terrestrial species are those which live entirely or predominantly on land. This includes species such as birds, insects, and land-based mammals.

==== Insects ====
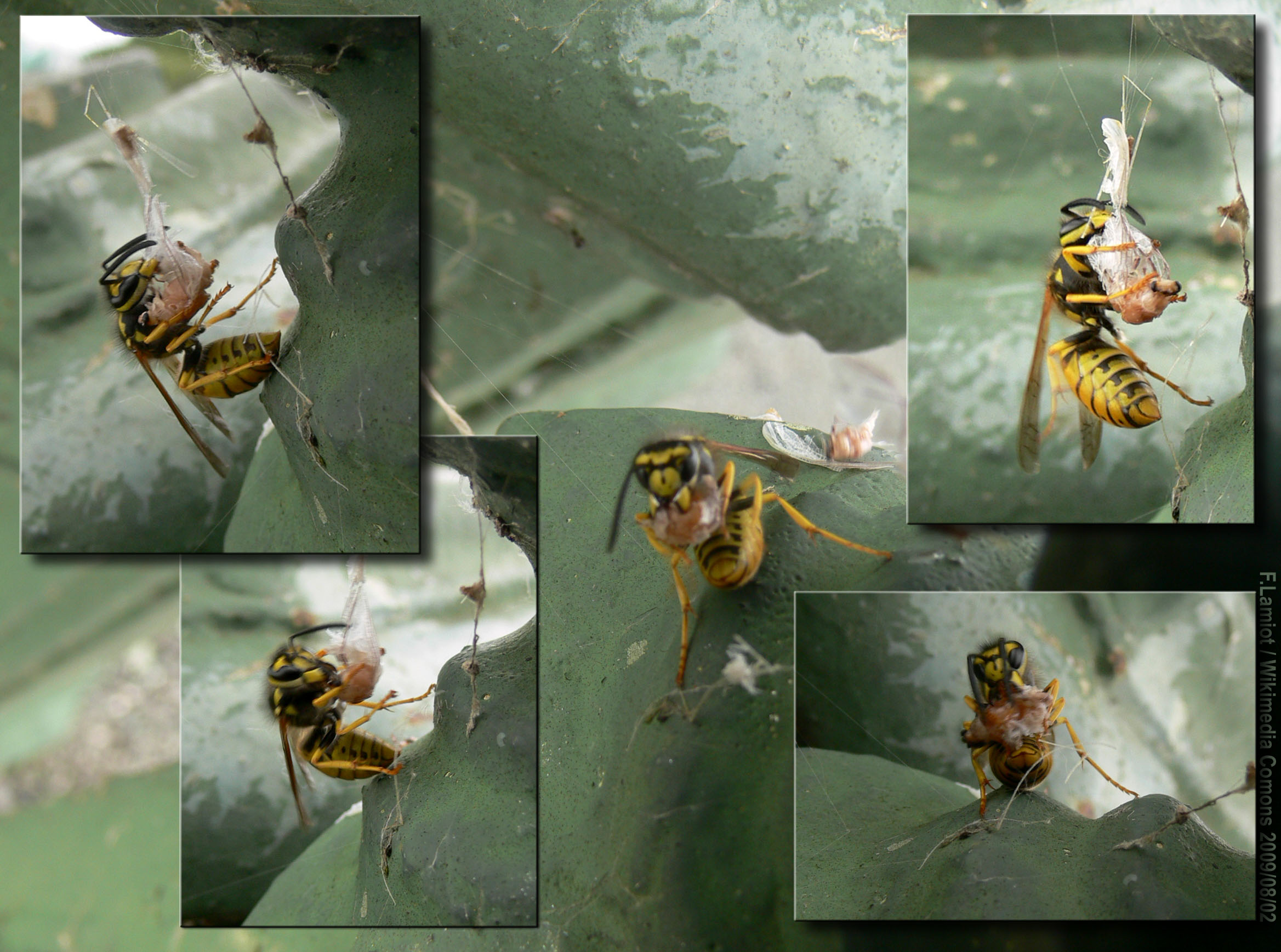
Light pollution can even affect the animals and plants active during the day, as these diurnal wasps that are stealing the nocturnal insects caught in spiderwebs near street lamps demonstrate.

The attraction of insects to artificial light is one of the most well-known examples of the effect of light at night on organisms. When insects are attracted to lamps they can be killed by exhaustion or contact with the lamp itself, and they are also more vulnerable to predators like bats.

Insects are affected differently by the varying wavelengths of light, and many species can see ultraviolet and infrared light that is invisible to humans. Nocturnal insects such as moths use light as a cue to maintain a correct height when flying, by turning the upper side of their body towards the light. However, when close to artificial light sources this can cause them to continuously steer around the light - essentially trapping them. Due to their sensitivity to Ultraviolet light (UV), moths are more attracted to broad spectrum white and bluish light sources than they are to the yellow light emitted by low-pressure sodium lamps.

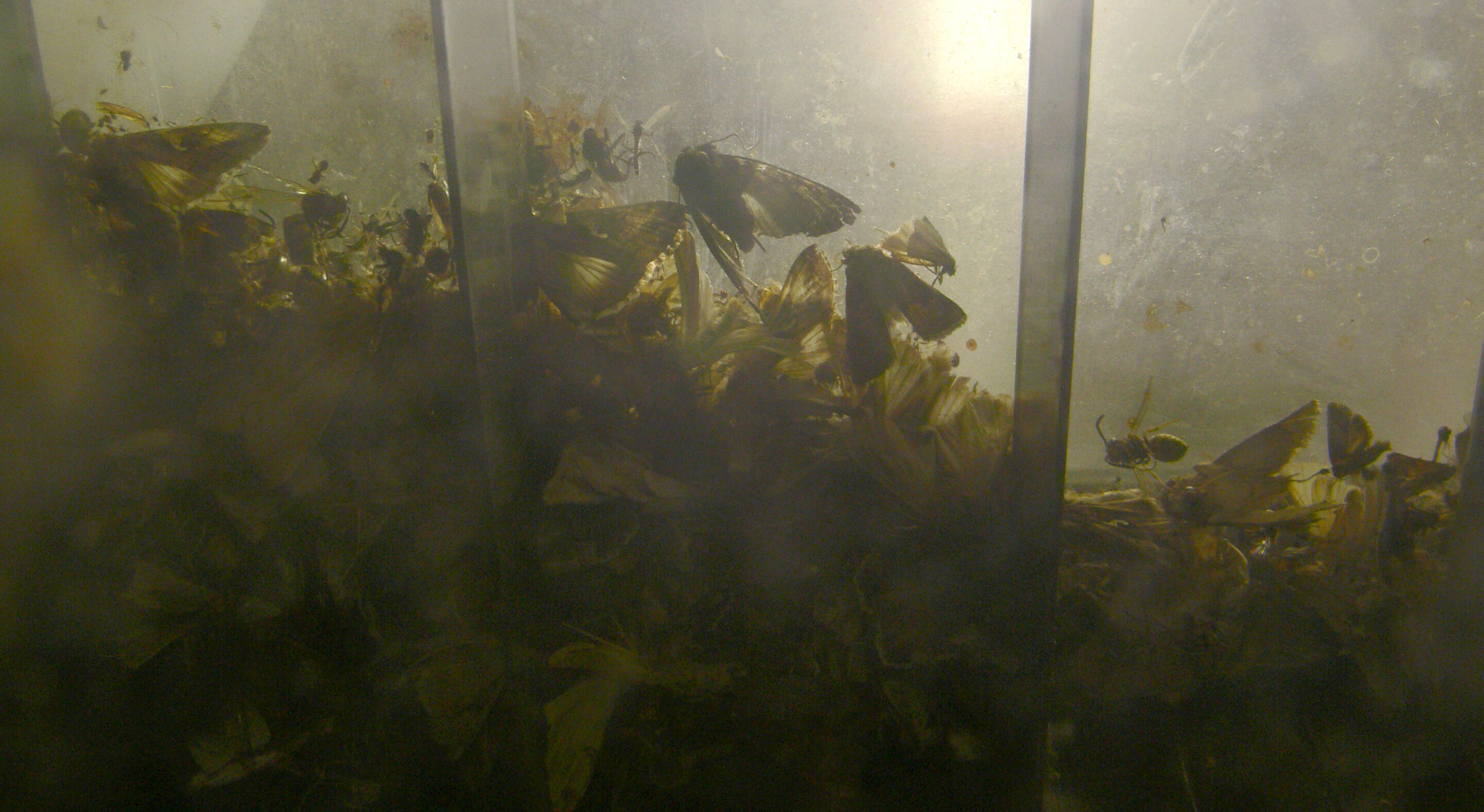
Insects killed by attraction to a buried light box.

Dragonflies perceive horizontally polarized light as a sign of water. For this reason, sources of water are indistinguishable from asphalt roads with polarized light pollution to them. Dragonflies searching for water either to drink or in which to lay eggs often land on roads or other dark flat reflective surfaces such as cars and remain there until they die of dehydration and hyperthermia.

Light pollution may hamper the mating rituals of fireflies, as they depend on their own light for courtship, resulting in decreased populations. Fireflies are charismatic and are easily spotted by nonexperts. Their rapid response to environmental changes, makes them good bioindicators for the problems caused by artificial light at night.

==== Amphibians ====
Artificial light at night has been suggested as an important factor in the global decline of amphibian populations. Many species are nocturnally active, and their biological rhythms could be affected by a change in their natural light-dark cycle. ALAN has also been linked to decreased growth and metamorphic duration. It can also alter the amount or timing of feeding, sexual behaviour and fertilization success, behaviour (such as improper orientation), and anti-predator behaviours.

==== Bats ====
Since most bats (Chiroptera) are nocturnal, they are severely affected by artificial light at night. These effects are highly species- and context specific. Effects range from disruption of migration and travel to hunting sites, finding and accessing roosts, and foraging behaviour.

==== Birds ====
Birds migrate during the night for several reasons. It is also cooler at night which means birds are able to fly and become dehydrated slower. With city lights outshining the night sky, birds have more difficulty navigating by stars.

Lights on tall structures can disorient migrating birds leading to fatalities. An estimated 365-988 million fatal bird collisions with buildings occur annually in North America, making human-made structures a large contributor to the decline in population of bird species. The surface area of the glass emitting the artificial light at night is a major factor for fatal bird collisions with buildings, and turning off lights at night can minimize these fatalities. The Fatal Light Awareness Program (FLAP) works with building owners in Toronto, Canada and other cities to reduce mortality of birds by turning out lights during migration periods.

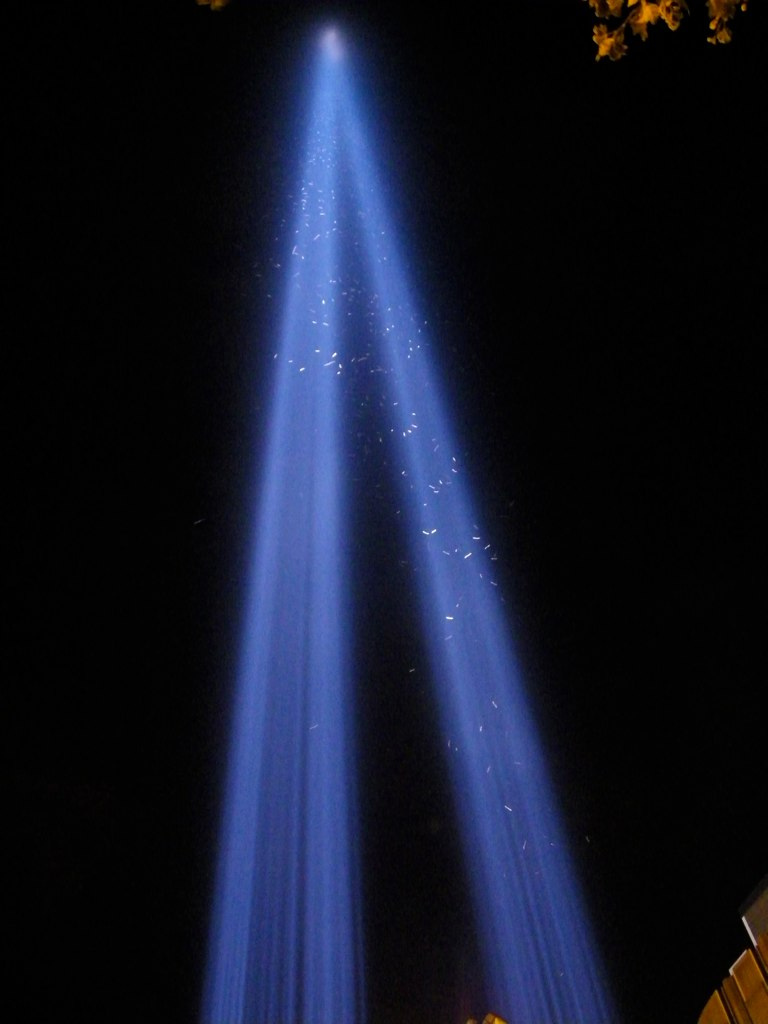
Migratory birds confused by the World Trade Center memorial searchlights.

Similar disorientation has also been noted for bird species migrating close to offshore production and drilling facilities. Studies carried out by Nederlandse Aardolie Maatschappij b.v. (NAM) and Shell have led to development and trial of new lighting technologies in the North Sea. In early 2007, the lights were installed on the Shell production platform L15. The experiment proved a great success since the number of birds circling the platform declined by 50–90%.[56] Juvenile seabirds may also be disoriented by lights as they leave their nests and fly out to sea causing events of high mortality. To minimise mortality rescue programs are conducted on many islands giving a second chance to thousands of seabird fledglings.

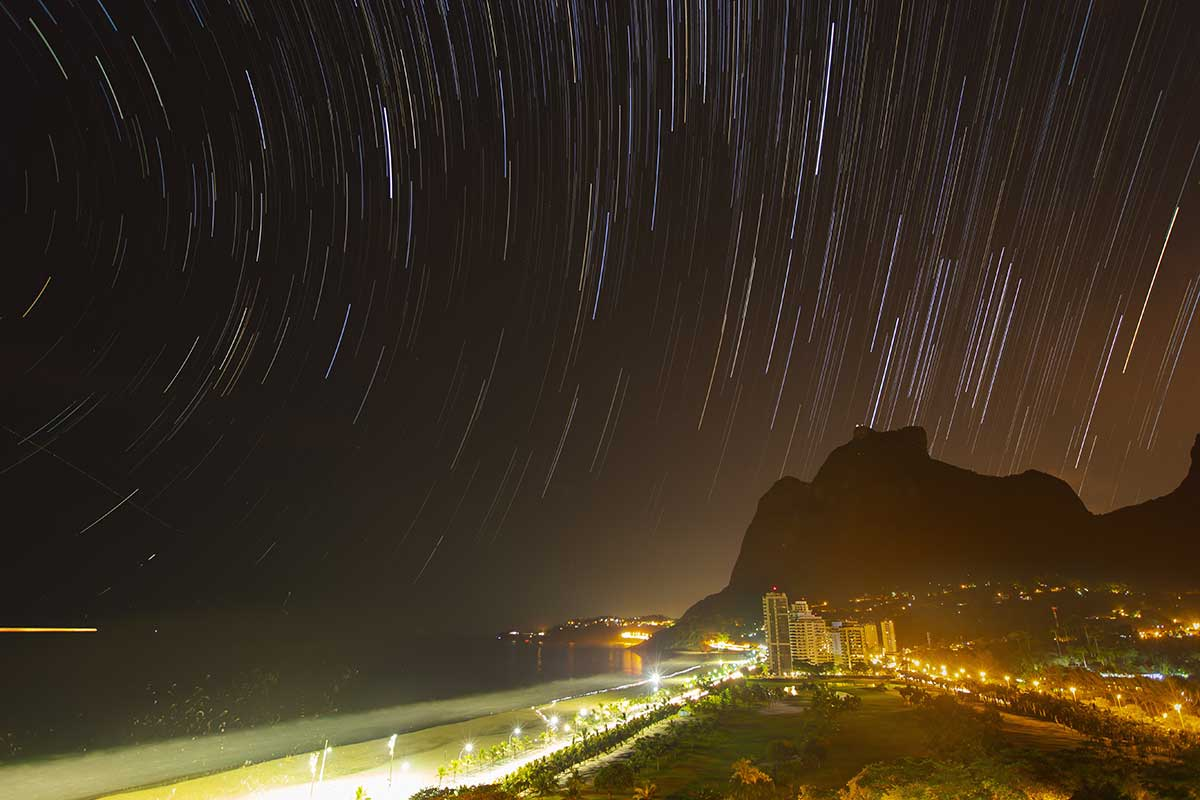
Brazil star trails and birds in light pollution photography in Rio beach at night

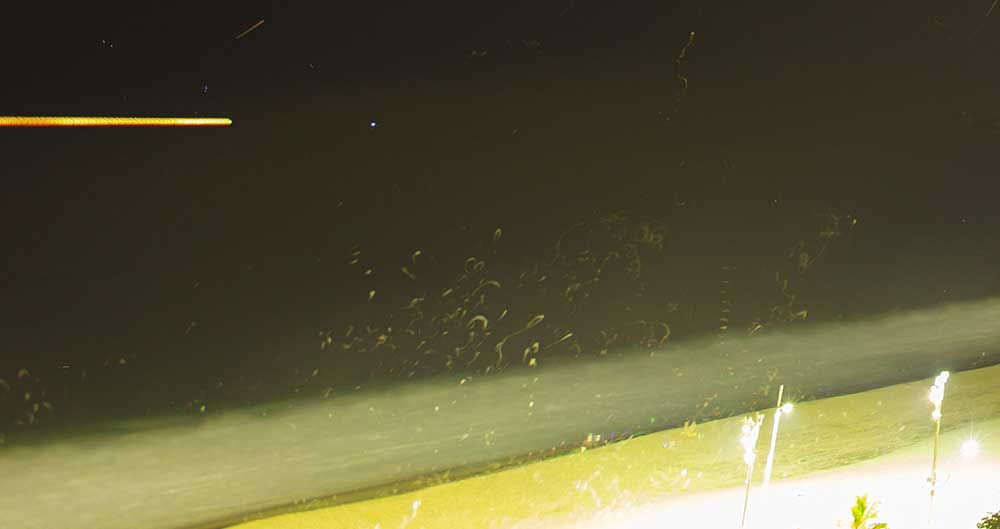
Birds flying trace and star trail near Rio de Janeiro beach at night time in light pollution

Ceilometers (searchlights) can be particularly deadly traps for birds, because they can become caught in the beams and be at risk of exhaustion and collisions with other birds. In the worst recorded ceilometer kill-off, on October 7–8, 1954, 50,000 birds from 53 different species were killed at Warner Robins Air Force Base.

As a result of light pollution, birds have been shown to experience sexual maturation earlier and forage more aggressively than previously identified.

A study published in Science used a global acoustic dataset of more than 60 million records of 583 diurnal bird species, to synthesize effects of light pollution. On average, light pollution prolonged vocal activity by 50 min., and the light pollution responses were strongest for species with large eyes, open nests, migratory habits, and large ranges and during the breeding season.

==== Turtles ====
Lights from seashore developments repel nesting sea turtle mothers. The turtle hatchlings should instinctively find their way toward the sea by using the light of the moon, but are often fatally attracted to landward lights such as street and hotel lights instead.

==== Plants ====
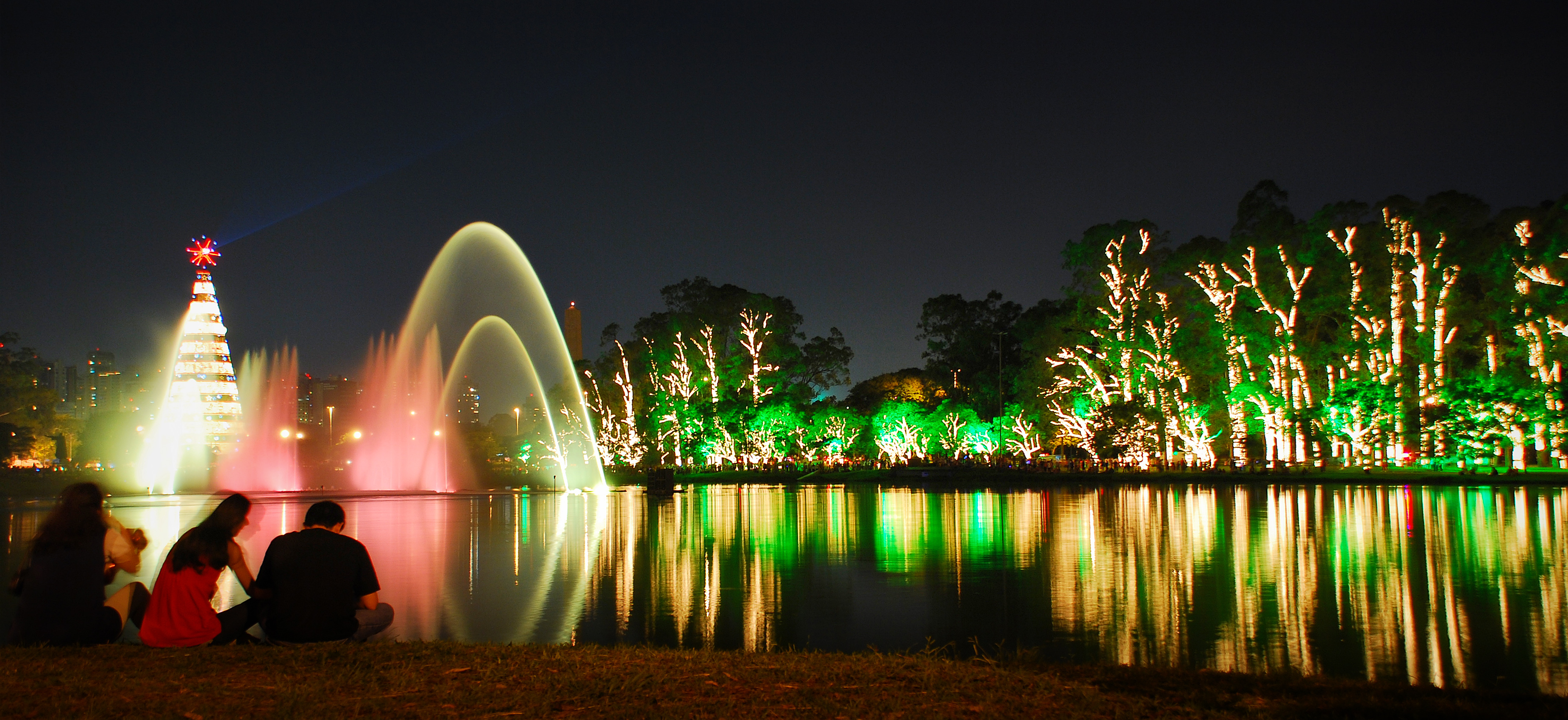
An urban park (Ibirapuera Park, Brazil) at night

Artificial lighting has many negative impacts on trees and plants, particularly in fall and autumn. Trees and herbaceous plants rely on the photoperiod, or the amount of time in a day where sunlight is available for photosynthesis, to help determine the changing seasons. When hours of sunlight decrease, plants can recognize that autumn is underway and begin to make preparations for winter dormancy. Deciduous trees shift the colour of their leaves to maximize different wavelengths of light that are more prevalent in the fall, before eventually dropping them as light becomes too scarce for photosynthesis to be worthwhile. When deciduous trees are exposed to light pollution, they mistake the artificial light for sunlight and retain their green leaves later into the autumn season. This can be dangerous for those trees, as the energy they waste trying to photosynthesize should be preserved for winter survival. Light pollution can also cause leaf stoma to remain open into the night, which leaves the tree vulnerable to infection and disease.

Similarly, light pollution in the spring can also be dangerous for trees and herbaceous plants. Artificial light can cause plants begin producing leaves for photosynthesizing at a time in the season when temperatures may not yet be warm enough to support the new leaf buds. Small herbaceous plants that are exposed to artificial lighting potentially face a greater risk, as more of their body is illuminated. Therefore, only the root system is protected, and could potentially not be enough to sustain the whole plant as it tries to remain green through the fall and winter. Light pollution can also cause certain trees to begin budding earlier than they normally would.

=== Aquatic ===
Aquatic animals are animals that live in the water. Animals like these include fish, dolphins, turtles, and many more. Ecological light pollution can also have critical effects on marine ecosystems. As of 2010, roughly 22% of the worlds coastline were exposed to nightly artificial light pollution.

==== Zooplankton ====
Zooplankton (e.g. Daphnia) exhibit diurnal vertical migration. That is, they actively change their vertical position inside of lakes throughout the day. In lakes with fish, the primary driver for their migration is light level, because small fish visually prey on them. The introduction of light through skyglow reduces the height to which they can ascend during the night. Because zooplankton feed on the phytoplankton that form algae, the decrease in their predation upon phytoplankton may increase the chance of algal blooms, which can kill off the lakes' plants and lower water quality.

==== Fish ====
Light pollution impacts migration in some species of fish. For example, juvenile chinook salmon are attracted to and slowed down by artificial light. It is possible that artificial light draws them closer to the shoreline, where they face a greater risk of predation from birds and mammals. Artificial lighting also attracts a greater density of piscivorous fish, which have an advantage due to the slower movement of the juvenile fish. Light pollution also has impacts on the hormonal functioning of some fish; European perch and roach both experience reductions in the production of reproductive hormones when exposed to artificial lighting in a rural environment. Artificial light has also been shown to cause disruptions to fish (and zooplankton) in the high Arctic, where fishing boats with lights resulted in a lack of fish up to 200 metres below the water's surface.

=== Humans ===
At the turn of the century it was discovered that human eyes contain a non-imaging photosensor that is the primary regulator of the human circadian rhythm. This photosensor is particularly affected by blue light, and when it observes light the pineal gland stops the secretion of melatonin. The presence of light at night in human dwellings (or for shift workers) makes going to sleep more difficult and reduces the overall level of melatonin in the bloodstream, and exposure to a low-level incandescent bulb for 39 minutes is sufficient to suppress melatonin levels to 50%. Because melatonin is a powerful anti-oxidant, it is hypothesized that this reduction can result in an increased risk of breast and prostate cancer. A suppression of melatonin has also been linked to obesity, diabetes, and depression.

One of the biggest ways humans receive artificial light at night is through technology such as phones, computers, and televisions. For computers and phones in particular, the light emitted is so close in proximity to the human eye that it has a profound impact on the human body and circadian rhythm. These forms of technology also emit a significant amount of blue light which impacts the non-imaging photosensor in the human eye which regulates the circadian rhythm.

Other human health effects may include increased headache incidence, worker fatigue, medically defined stress, decrease in sexual function and increase in anxiety. In places with high levels of nighttime light, such as cities, mood disorders and anxiety have been linked to artificial light at night. Likewise, animal models have been studied demonstrating unavoidable light to produce adverse effect on mood and anxiety.

== Effects of different wavelengths ==
The effect that artificial light has upon organisms is wavelength dependent. While human beings cannot see ultraviolet light, it is often used by entomologists to attract insects. Generally speaking, blue light is more likely to be damaging to mammals because the non-imaging photoreceptors in mammalian eyes are most sensitive in the blue region. Exposure to blue light in humans, especially at night, has been associated with decreased melatonin, leading to sleep disorders and stress.

In the environment, Rayleigh scattering contributes to the brightness of the night sky. This implies that shorter wavelength waves, such as blue light, are scattered more than those with longer wavelengths (red and green light). This means that if traditional vapour discharge streetlamps are replaced by white LEDs (which generally emit more of their radiation in the blue part of the spectrum), the ecological impact could be greater even if the total amount of radiated light is decreased.

== Polarized light pollution ==
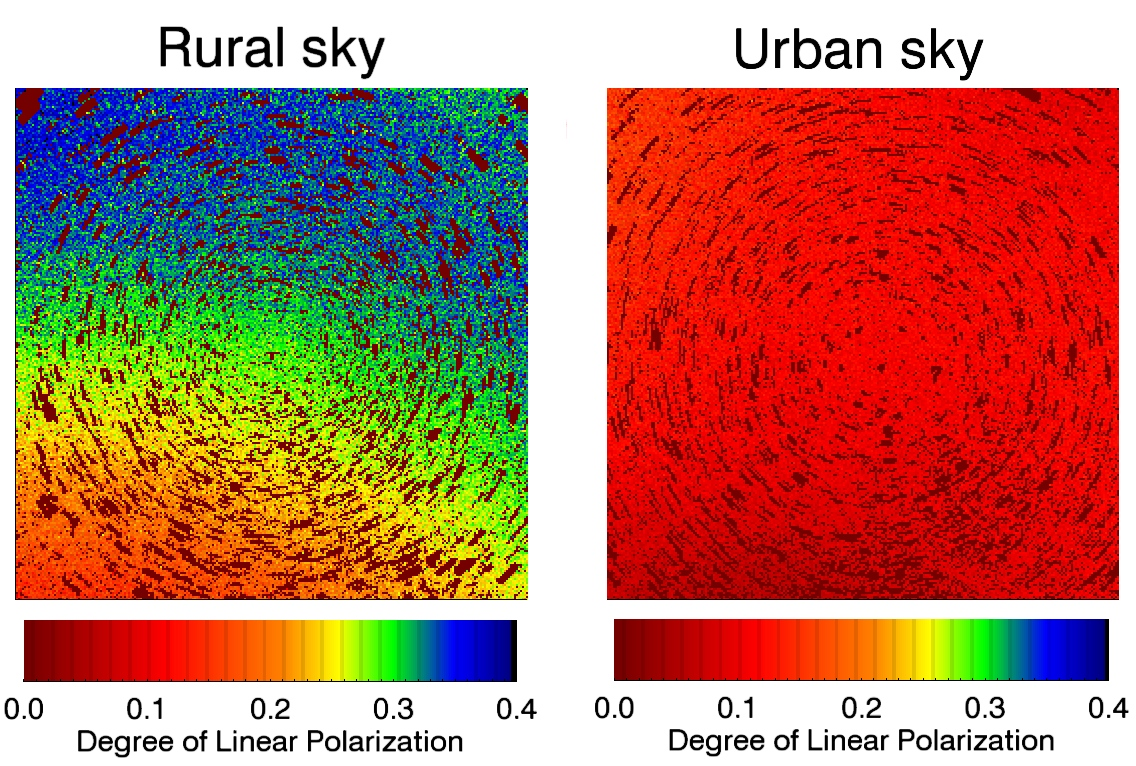
Light pollution is mostly unpolarized, and its addition to moonlight results in a decreased polarization signal.

Artificial planar surfaces, such as glass windows or asphalt reflect highly polarized light. Polarized light pollution is caused by our choice of technology and materials and can be reduced by more thoughtfully selecting materials for construction. One notable example of polarized light is the light that is reflected by the glass of a watch. Many insects are attracted to polarized surfaces, because polarization is usually an indicator for water. This effect is called polarized light pollution, and although it is certainly a form of ecological photopollution, "ecological light pollution" usually refers to the impact of artificial light on organisms.

In the night, the polarization of the moonlit sky is very strongly reduced in the presence of urban light pollution, because scattered urban light is not strongly polarized. Since polarized moonlight is believed to be used by many animals for navigation, this screening is another negative effect of light pollution on ecology.

== See also ==
- Dark infrastructure
- Light effects on circadian rhythm
- Photobiology
- Scotobiology
