= New England Light Pollution Advisory Group =

The New England Light Pollution Advisory Group (NELPAG) is a volunteer organization founded in 1993 to educate the public on the benefits of using efficient, glare-free outdoor night lighting. It is an affiliate of the International Dark-Sky Association. It is thought that the NELPAG hosted the first-ever website on light pollution, and it hosted the website of the International Dark Sky Association early on before the IDSA copied it over and developed at more fully, leaving the NELPAG website to continue on its own.

NELPAG maintains a wide range of resources about outdoor-lighting issues. These include background articles on the terminology and principles of outdoor lighting, details of current and pending state legislation concerning outdoor lighting, a chronicle of relevant news reports from the New England region, lists of towns with outdoor-lighting regulations, and samples of such ordinances.

NELPAG also sponsors occasional meetings throughout the New England region that bring together lighting engineers, astronomers, policy makers, journalists, and the general public for discussion of improvement in outdoor night lighting. The NELPAG has not been so active since about 2010, but these pages are preserved as having high relevance for people assessing the problems of light pollution and what solutions can be undertaken. Lightbulbs have undergone much change in the last decade or two, and the importance of shielding lights to reduce glare has not abated at all.
