= Polarized light pollution =

Subset of light pollution

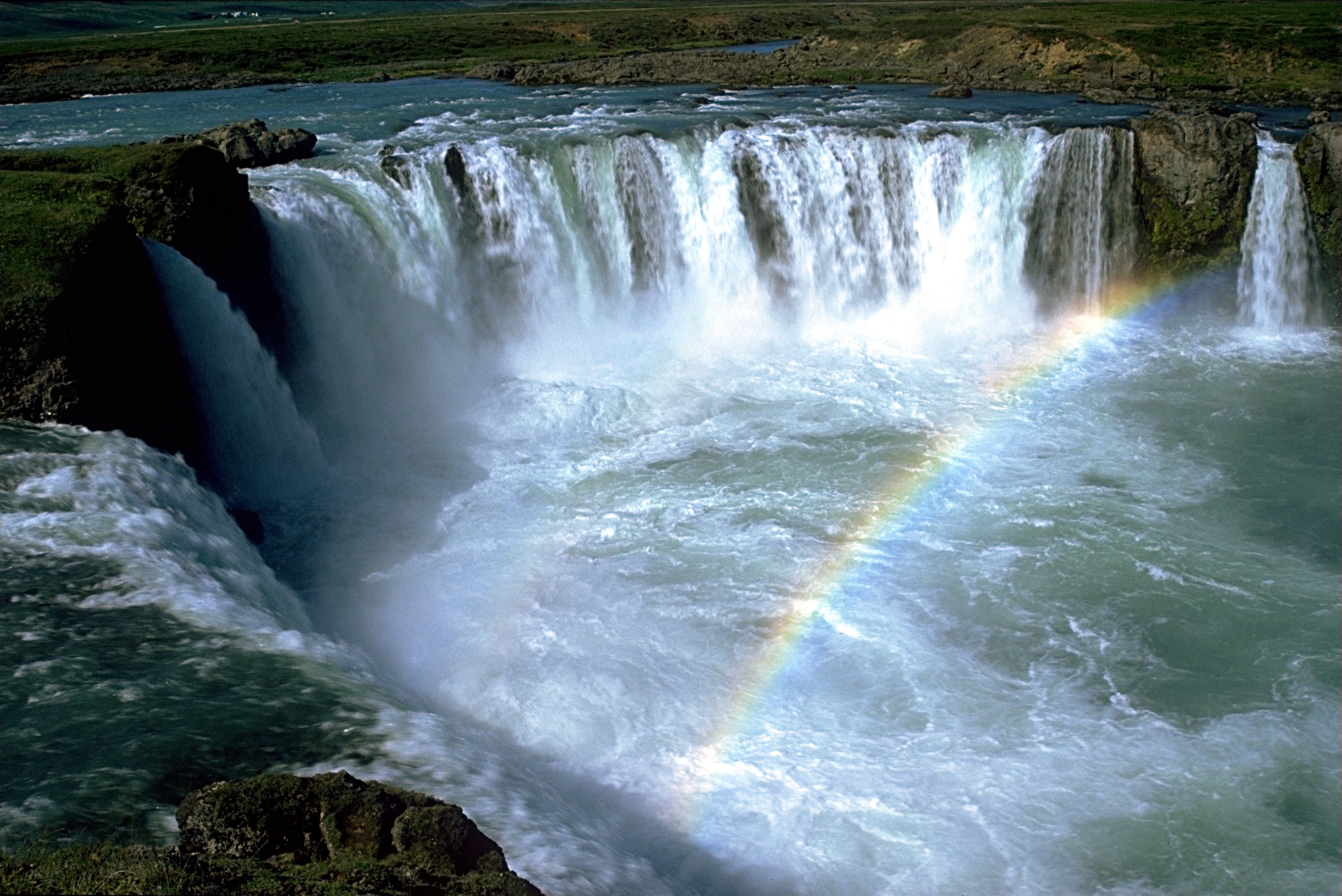
In nature, water and water vapor polarize natural sunlight in other planes than vertical.

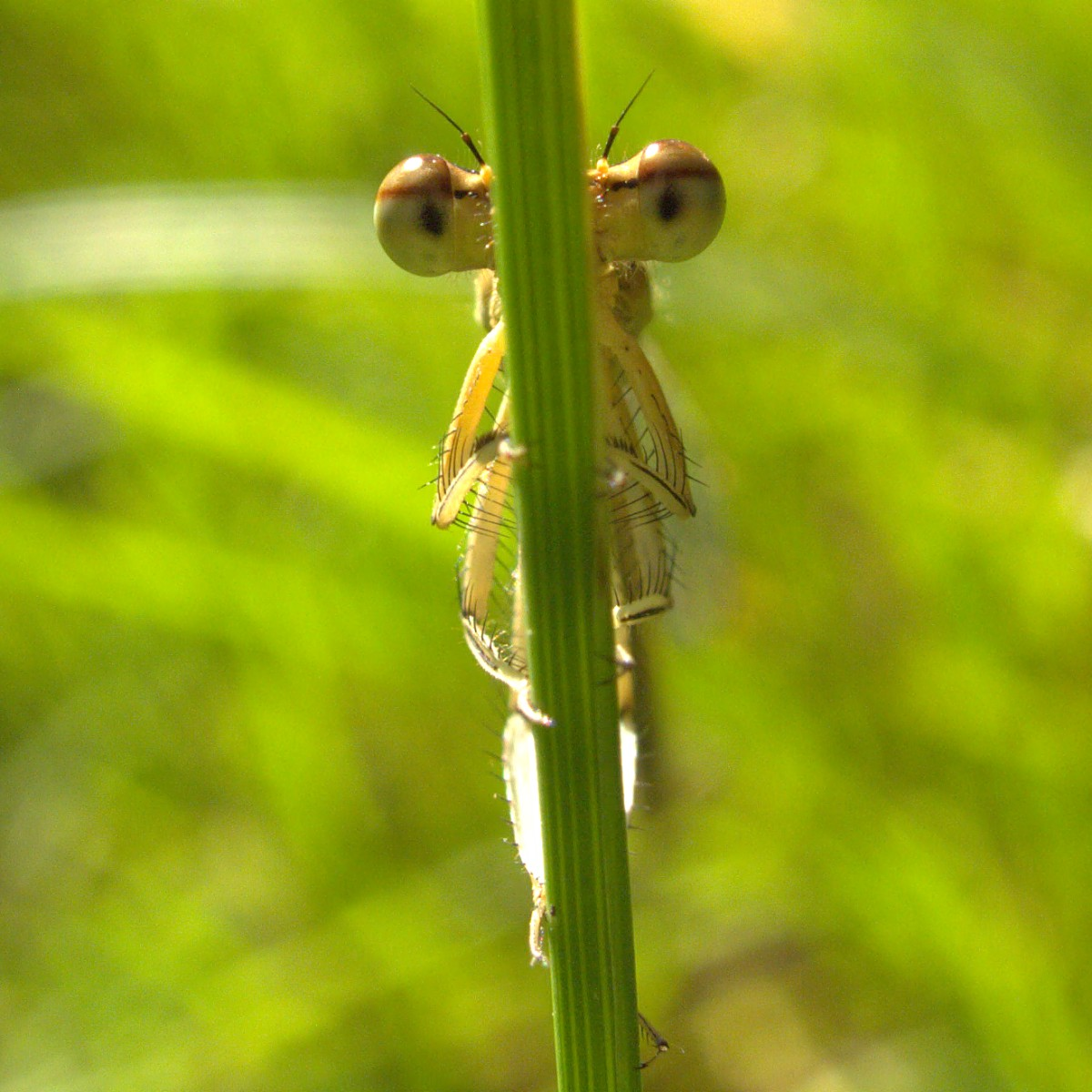
The eye facets of Platycnemis pennipes collect light directly or incidentally. That gives environmental information to the insect

Polarization is a property of light waves that describes the orientation of their oscillations. Polarized light pollution is a subset of the various forms of light pollution referring specifically to polarized light.

In nature, water and water vapor polarize the sunlight (which itself is slightly polarized). By receiving the direction of polarized photons, some species can correct their course during migration. Artificial polarization of natural or artificial light can disrupt the behavior of these species and the ecosystems in which these species play an important role. Pollination is one example of this.

== History of this notion ==
Jean-Baptiste Biot and his successors have shown that solutions of organic products, such as fructose or sucrose, can polarize light. However, only in recent decades has it been realised that the polarized light may play an important role in ecosystems, especially in the insect world.

More recently, when the concept of light pollution emerged, the question of the possible impacts of the artificial polarization of light has arisen.

Gábor Horváth and his team have proposed that this new term needs to be better described and understood in order to better address the specific ecological consequences (direct or delayed in space and time) of light that was polarized (at source or by interacting with objects made or modified by humans).

== Impact on insects ==
A representative example is the ecological trap caused by asphalt surfaces polarizing light in a similar way as ponds do. Research has shown swarms of mayflies are laying their eggs on roads rather than rivers or ponds. Many insects have aquatic larval stage, and they largely depend on visual cues such as the light reflection of ponds or rivers to find egg-laying places. They therefore often mistake asphalt surface for water and lay eggs directly on the road, leaving the eggs to dehydrate and die under the sun.

== Impact on crustaceans ==
Mantis shrimp (Oratosquilla oratoria) has a complex compound eyes, which allow it to detect a broad spectrum of wavelengths, including the polarized light. When exposed to artificial polarize light, mechanisms that are key in determining its visual ability, such as development of retinal cells and the transmission of light signals, will all be impaired. This pollution is also related with downregulation of vital genes that control reproduction and immune responses.
