= Family trees of the Norse gods =

These are family trees of the Norse gods showing kin relations among gods and other beings in Nordic mythology. Each family tree reflects principally Eddic portrayals of relations, however precise links can vary between sources. Some links are also dependent on two beings being identified as the same by sources or scholars. These family trees, and the relations that comprise them, reflect views from the times and contexts in which the Eddas were produced and recorded and do not likely represent ideas held by all Germanic heathens historically. Instead of a strict and consistent system, there was likely high variation over region and time, with the centrality of Odin seen in the Eddas, for example, likely being a later development further reinforced by Snorri Sturluson.

== Key ==
- Æsir are indicated with **boldface**
- Vanir are indicated with italics
- Other beings such as jötnar and humans are indicated with standard font.

== Æsir ==
Ymir
Þrúðgelmir | Fornjót
Búri | Bölþorn (Note: Bölþorn is only mentioned in Hávamál stanza 140 and Gylfaginning chapter 5. In these sources, the relationship with Bestla is established but the exact line of parents back to Ymir, progenitor of all jötnar, is not.) | Bergelmir | Ægir | Rán | Narfi
Fjörgynn | Borr | Bestla | Nine sisters | Naglfari | Nótt | **Dellingr**
Annar
**Frigg** | **Odin** | **Vili** | **Vé** | **Hœnir** (Note: In Völuspá 18, Hœnir is listed as one of the three gods who created the first humans, Ask and Embla, along with Lóðurr and Odin, while in Snorri Sturluson's account, it is Odin, Vili and Vé. Hœnir may be identified with either Vili or Vé, however this is equivocal.) | **Heimdallr** | Auðr
Jörð (Fjörgyn) | **Dagr**
Nepr | Gríðr | Rindr
Nanna | **Baldr** | **Týr** (Note: The father of Týr is ambiguous. In Hymiskviða, Týr is called the son of the jötunn Hymir, while Snorri Sturluson in the Prose Edda names his father as Odin.) | **Höðr** | **Hermóðr** | **Bragi** | **Iðunn** | **Víðarr** | **Váli** | Skjöldr | **Gefjon** | Unnamed jötunn | **Sif** | **Thor** | Járnsaxa (Note: Járnsaxa is named as a tröllkona in the Nafnaþulur, while in Skáldskaparmál chapter 21, she is identified with Sif.) | Döglingar
**Forseti** | Scyldings | 4 sons | **Ullr** | **Móði** (Note: While Móði's father is named as Thor in Hymiskviða 34, Gylfaginning 52 and Skáldskaparmál 4, his mother is never explicitly identified.) | **Þrúðr** | **Magni**

== Vanir ==
Alvaldi
Þjazi | Iði | Gangr
Gymir | Aurboða | Sister-wife of Njörðr | Njörðr | Skaði
Beli (Note: The identification of Beli with the brother of Gerðr is only through Freyr killing both her unnamed brother and Beli. Due to the sparse evidence, the conclusion is equivocal.) | Gerðr | Freyr | Freyja | **Óðr**
Ynglings | **Hnoss** | **Gersemi**

== Angrboða and Loki ==
Fárbauti | Nál (Laufey)
Sigyn | Loki | Angrboða | Býleistr | Helblindi
Váli | Narfi | Fenrir | Jörmungandr | Hel

== Diversity in belief ==
While the above family trees are based principally on Eddic material, it is widely accepted that the Eddas do not represent the worldview of all Nordic, or more widely Germanic heathens. Folklorist Terry Gunnell has similarly challenged the concept of all Germanic pagans throughout the Viking Age believing in a single, universal pantheon of gods that all lived in Asgard and were ruled by Odin. Cultural exchange of both ideas and practices occurred across the soft cultural boundaries with neighbouring peoples from broad cultural groups such as Celts, Sámi, Baltic peoples, and, particularly later on, Christians. Geographical variation in religious practices and beliefs was also seen, which together with external influence made the belief systems dynamic, changing over time from the Nordic Bronze Age into the Viking age.

In the Early Medieval period, Odin was principally a god of the warrior elite, however, due to his close association with skalds, whose poetry was preserved in works such as the Prose Edda and Heimskringla, he is highly represented in extant sources on Nordic pre-Christian religion. Snorri Sturluson also seems to have a preference towards the aristocratic-centred cosmology as opposed to the views more likely held by the wider population. The rise to prominence of male, war-oriented gods such as Odin, relative to protective female gods with a closer association to fertility and watery sites, has been proposed to have taken place around 500 CE, coinciding with the development of an expansionist aristocratic military class in southern Scandinavia.

Very rarely in the Eddic stories are the gods described as forming a large family, instead typically acting individually or in groups of three. Gunnell puts forward the idea that the stories did not originate in the same cultural environment, but instead were collected over a wide geographic area and later compiled. This variation may be the cause of the apparent conflicts between sources, such as the most closely associated female god to Odin, which Gunnell suggests never formed a single unified system. He further puts forward the idea that Odinic myths centred on hierarchical assemblies and feasts originated in, and reflected, the halls of the elite, while the rural population would be more familiar with tales regarding Freyr and Thor; these two gods have a significantly more prominent position than Odin in Icelandic and Norwegian place names, sagas and Landnámabók. Gunnell suggests that Freyr, whose cult was centred in Uppland in Sweden, as another figure who acts more as an allfather (Old Norse: alfǫðr) than Odin, based on his diverse roles in farming, ruling and warfare.

Gunnell further argues that in stories regarding Thor, he is typically highly independent, requiring little aid from other figures. He notes that Thor would fit well into the role of a chief god, being associated with trees, high-seat pillars and rain, and is called upon for help at sea and against Christian missionaries. Some sources, such as the prologue to the Prose Edda suggest that Thor was viewed by some as the father of Odin, and it has been argued that Thor was known in Northern Europe prior to the arrival of the cult of Odin, and thus would not have been originally viewed there as his son.

It has been argued that Odin began to increasingly incorporate elements from subordinated gods and took on a role as the centre of a family that became depicted as living together. This conception, more akin to the Olympian pantheon, may have been facilitated by large things in which a diversity of peoples assembled, each potentially favouring an individual god.

== See also ==
- Anglo-Saxon royal genealogies
- Horses of the Æsir
- List of Germanic deities
- Norse cosmology

== Bibliography ==
=== Primary ===
- The Elder Edda: A Book of Viking Lore. Translated by Orchard, Andy. London: Penguin Books. 2011. ISBN 9780141393728.
- Sturluson, Snorri (2018). The Prose Edda. Translated by Brodeur, Arthur Gilchrist. Franklin Classics Trade Press. ISBN 9780344335013.
- "Nafnaþulur (Old Norse)". heimskringla.no.

=== Secondary ===
- Branston, Brian (1955). Gods of the North. Thames & Hudson.
- Faulkes, Anthony (1995). Edda. Everyman. ISBN 0-460-87616-3.
- Grimes, Heilan Yvette (2010). The Norse Myths. Boston: Hollow Earth Publishing. pp. 311–313. ISBN 978-1879196025.
- Gunnell, Terry (2015). "Pantheon? What Pantheon? Concepts of a Family of Gods in Pre-Christian Scandinavian Religions". Scripta Islandica: Isländska sällskapets årsbok. 66. Isländska sällskapet: 55–76.
- Gunnell, Terry (2017). "Blótgyðjur, Goðar, Mimi, Incest, and Wagons: Oral Memories of the". Old Norse Mythology—Comparative Perspectives. Ed. Pernille Hermann, Stephen A. Mitchell, and Jens Peter Schjødt, with Amber J. Rose.
- Leeming, David (2005). The Oxford Companion to World Mythology. USA: Oxford University Press. ISBN 0195156692.
- Lindow, John (2002). Norse Mythology: A Guide to the Gods, Heroes, Rituals, and Beliefs. Oxford University Press. ISBN 0199839697.
- Simek, Rudolf (2008). A Dictionary of Northern Mythology. Translated by Hall, Angela. BOYE6. ISBN 9780859915137.
