= Annar =

Norse deity

In Norse mythology, according to the Gylfaginning, Annar (Old Norse Annarr 'second, another') is the father of Jörð (Mother Earth) by Nótt (the Night). The form Ónar (Old Norse Ónarr 'gaping') is found as a variant.

Annar/Ónar is also the name of a dwarf in the catalogue of dwarfs in the Völuspá that is repeated in the Gylfaginning.

== Attestations ==
In the pseudo-historical genealogy of Odin's ancestors in the introduction to Snorri Sturluson's Prose Edda, a certain Athra is said to be he "whom we call Annar". What this refers to is unknown. (See Sceafa for discussion of the section of this genealogy in which Annar appears.)

In the Gylfaginning Snorri writes of Nótt:

She was given to the man named Naglfari; their son was Aud. Afterward she was wedded to him that was called Annar; Jörð ['Earth'] was their daughter.

Snorri might have been using a source in which annar 'second, another' was intended to mean Odin, for he himself had just previously written of Odin: "The earth was his daughter and his wife...".

But in the Skáldskaparmál Snorri uses the form Ónar instead, giving "daughter of Ónar" as one of the kennings for Jörð. Snorri also cites from Hallfreðr vandræðaskáld:

In council it was determined

That the King's friend, wise in counsel,
Should wed the Land, sole daughter

Of Ónar, greenly wooded.
