= Dellingr =

Norse deity

In Norse mythology, Dellingr (Old Norse possibly "the dayspring" or "shining one") is a god. Dellingr is attested in the Poetic Edda, compiled in the 13th century from earlier traditional sources, and in the Prose Edda, written in the 13th century by Snorri Sturluson. In both sources, Dellingr is described as the father of Dagr, the personified day. The Prose Edda adds that, depending on manuscript variation, he is either the third husband of Nótt, the personified night, or the husband of Jörð, the personified earth. Dellingr is also attested in the legendary saga Hervarar saga ok Heiðreks. Scholars have proposed that Dellingr is the personified dawn and his name may appear both in an English surname and place name.

== Attestations ==
=== Poetic Edda ===
Dellingr is referenced in the Poetic Edda poems Vafþrúðnismál and Hávamál. In stanza 24 of Vafþrúðnismá, the god Odin (disguised as "Gagnráðr") asks the jötunn Vafþrúðnir from where the day comes, and the night and its tides. In stanza 25, Vafþrúðnir responds:

Delling hight he who the day's father is, but
night was of Nörvi born; the new and waning moons the
beneficent powers created, to count the years for men.

In Hávamál, the dwarf Þjóðrœrir is stated as having recited an unnamed spell "before Delling's doors":

For the fifteenth I know what the dwarf Thiodreyrir
sang before Delling's doors.
Strength he sang to the Æsir, and to the Alfar prosperity,
wisdom to Hroptatyr.

In the poem Fjölsvinnsmál, Svipdagr asks "What one of the gods has made so great the hall I behold within?" Fjölsviðr responds with a list of names, including Dellingr. In a stanza of the poem Hrafnagaldr Óðins, the appearance of Dagr, horse, and chariot are described, and Dagr himself is referred to as "the son of Delling."

=== Prose Edda ===
In chapter 10 of the Prose Edda book Gylfaginning, the enthroned figure of High states that Dellingr is a god and the third husband of Nótt. The couple have Dagr, who carries the features of his "father's people", which are described as "bright and beautiful". Odin placed both Dellingr's son, Dagr, and Dellingr's wife, Nótt, in the sky, so that they may ride across it with their horses and chariots every 24 hours.

However, scholar Haukur Thorgeirsson points out that the four manuscripts of Gylfaginning vary in their descriptions of the family relations between Nótt, Jörð, Dagr, and Dellingr. In other words, depending on the manuscript, either Jörð or Nótt is the mother of Dagr and partner of Dellingr. Haukur details that "the oldest manuscript, U, offers a version where Jǫrð is married to Dellingr and the mother of Dagr while the other manuscripts, R, W and T, cast Nótt in the role of Dellingr's wife and Dagr's mother", and argues that "the version in U came about accidentally when the writer of U or its antecedent shortened a text similar to that in RWT. The results of this accident made their way into the Icelandic poetic tradition".

=== Hervarar saga ok Heiðreks ===
Five riddles found in the poem Heiðreks gátur contained in the legendary saga Hervarar saga ok Heiðreks employ the phrase "Delling's doors" (Old Norse Dellings durum) once each. As an example, in one stanza where the phrase is used Gestumblindi (Odin in disguise) poses the following riddle:

What strange marvel
did I see without,
in front of Delling's door;
its head turning
to Hel downward,
but its feet ever seek the sun?
This riddle ponder,
O prince Heidrek!

'Your riddle is good, Gestumblindi,' said the king; 'I have guessed it. It is the leek; its head is fast in the ground, but it forks as it grows up.'

== Theories ==
Jacob Grimm states that Dellingr is the assimilated form of Deglingr, which includes the name of Dellingr's son Dagr. Grimm adds that if the -ling likely refers to descent, and that due to this Dellingr may have been the "progenitor Dagr before him" or that the succession order has been reversed, which Grimm states often occurs in old genealogies. Benjamin Thorpe says that Dellingr may be dawn personified, similarly to his son Dagr, the personified day.

Regarding the references to "Delling's door" as used in Hervarar saga ok Heiðreks, Christopher Tolkien says that:

What this phrase meant to the maker of these riddles is impossible to say. In Hávamál 160 it is said that the dwarf Thjódrørir sang before Delling's doors, which (as Delling is the father of Dag (Day) in Vafþrúðnismál 25) may mean that he gave warning to his people that the sun was coming up, and they must return to their dark houses; the phrase would then virtually mean 'at sunrise.' As regarding dǫglings for Dellings in H, and Dǫglingar were the descendants of Dagr (according to SnE. 183).

John Lindow says that some confusion exists about the reference to Dellingr in Hávamál. Lindow says that "Dellingr's doors" may either be a metaphor for sunrise or the reference may refer to the dwarf of the same name.

The English family name Dallinger has been theorized as deriving from Dellingr. The English place name Dalbury (south of Derbyshire) derives from Dellingeberie, which itself derives from Dellingr.

== See also ==
- Ēostre, an Old English goddess possibly associated with the dawn
