= List of night deities =

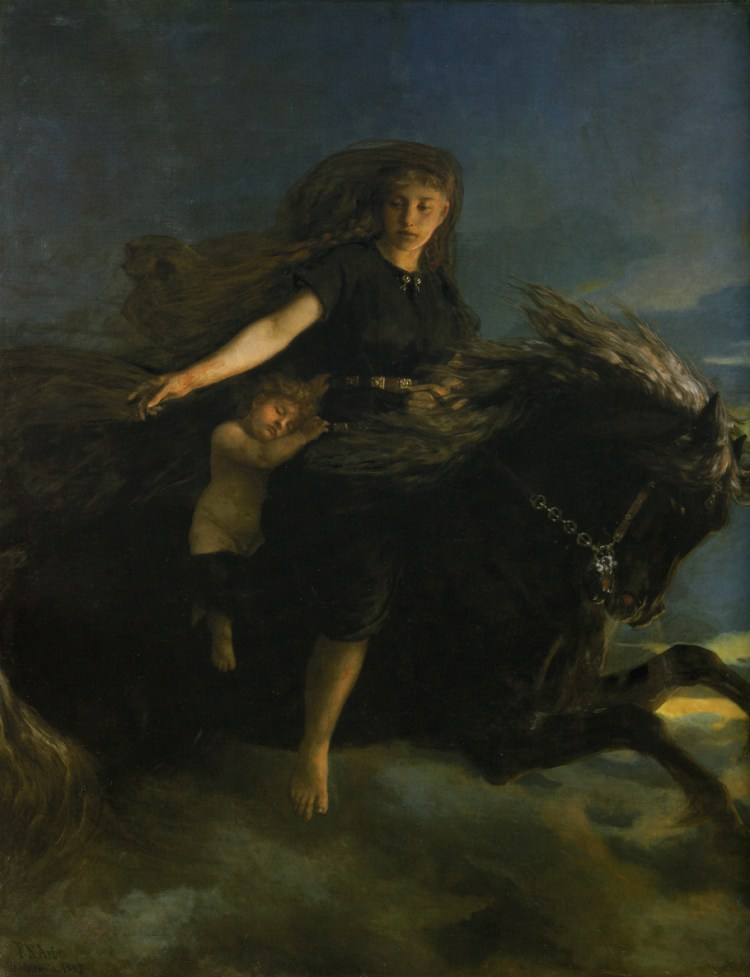
The Norse night goddess Nótt riding her horse, in a 19th-century painting by Peter Nicolai Arbo

A night deity is a goddess or god in mythology associated with night, or the night sky. They commonly feature in polytheistic religions. The following is a list of night deities in various mythologies.

== Arabian ==
- Al-Qaum, Nabatean god of war and the night, and guardian of caravans

== Aztec ==
- Lords of the Night, a group of nine gods, each of whom ruled over a particular night
- Itzpapalotl, fearsome skeletal goddess of the stars
- Metztli, god or goddess of the moon, night, and farmers
- Tezcatlipoca, god of the night sky, the night winds, hurricanes, the north, the earth, obsidian, enmity, discord, rulership, divination, temptation, jaguars, sorcery, beauty, war, and strife
- Tzitzimimeh, skeletal goddesses of the stars
- Yohaulticetl, the lunar goddess known as the "Lady of the Night"

== Canaanite ==
- Shalim, god of dusk

== Egyptian ==
- Khonsu, god of the moon
- Nut, goddess of the night also associated with rebirth

== Greco-Roman ==
Greek

- Achlys, a primordial goddess of the clouding of eyes after death, the eternal night, and poison
- Artemis, the goddess of the hunt, the wilderness, and wild animals, who was commonly associated with the moon
- Astraeus, Titan god of the dusk, stars, planets, and the art of Astronomy and Astrology
- Asteria, Titan goddess of nocturnal oracles and the stars
- Hades, god of the underworld, whose domain included night and darkness
- Hecate, the goddess of boundaries, crossroads, witchcraft, and ghosts, who was commonly associated with the moon
- Nyx, the primordial goddess and personification of the night
- Selene, Titaness goddess and personification of the moon
- Thanatos, the personification of death, the son of Nyx and Erebus and twin brother of Hypnos

Roman

- Diana Trivia, goddess of the hunt, the moon, crossroads, equivalent to the Greek goddesses Artemis and Hecate
- Latona, mother goddess of day and night, equivalent to the Greek goddess Leto
- Luna, goddess of the moon, equivalent to the Greek goddess Selene
- Nox, primordial goddess of night; equivalent to the Greek goddess Nyx
- Summanus, god of nocturnal thunder

Etruscan

- Artume (also called Aritimi, Artames, or Artumes), Etruscan goddess of the night; equivalent to the Greek goddess Artemis

== Hindu ==
- Ratri, goddess of night
- Chandra, god of the moon
- Rahu, celestial deity of darkness and eclipse
- Bhairava, god of night, guardian of all 52 Shakta pithas
- Kali, goddess of death
- Dewi Ratih, Balinese goddess of the moon

== Hurrian ==
- DINGIR.GE_{6} (reading uncertain), goddess representing the night and associated with dreaming

== Persian ==
- Ahriman, god of darkness, night and evils

== Lithuanian ==
- Aušrinė, goddess of the morning star
- Breksta, goddess of twilight and dreams, who protects people from sunset to sunrise
- Mėnuo, god of the moon
- Vakarė, goddess of the evening star
- Žvaigždės, goddesses of the stars and planets

== Meitei/Sanamahism ==
- Sajik (Arietis)
- Thaba (Musca)
- Khongjom Nubi (Pleiades)
- Apaknga (Lunar mansions)
- Sachung Telheiba (A Orionis)
- Likla Saphaba (Orion)
- Chingcharoibi (G Geminorum)
- Chungshennubi (Cancer)
- Leipakpokpa (Mars)
- Yumsakeisa (Mercury)
- Sagolsen (Jupiter)
- Irai (Venus)
- Thangja (Saturn)
- Shakok (Uranus)
- Shamei (Neptune)

== Norse ==
- Nótt, female personification of night
- Máni, male personification of the Moon

== Polynesian ==
- Hine-nui-te-pō, goddess of night and death and the ruler of the underworld in Māori mythology
- Ira, sky goddess and mother of the stars
- Taonoui, Māʻohi goddess who was the mother of the stars

== Slavic ==
- Zorya, two guardian goddesses, representing the morning and evening stars
- Chernobog, god of darkness, chaos, famine, pain, and all that is evil

== See also ==
- Chthonic (underworld) deities
- Lists of deities in Sanamahism
