= Auðr (mythology) =

Figure in Nordic mythology

In Norse mythology, Auðr (Old Norse "prosperity") is the son of the personified night, Nótt, fathered by Naglfari, and uncle of Thor. Auðr is attested in the Prose Edda, written in the 13th century by Snorri Sturluson, and in the poetry of skalds.

== Attestations ==
In the Prose Edda, Auðr is mentioned three times; once in the book Gylfaginning and twice in Skáldskaparmál. In chapter 10 of Gylfaginning, High says that, during Nótt's marriage to Naglfari, the couple had a son, Auðr. In chapter 32 of Skáldskaparmál, means of referring to Jörð, the personified earth, are provided, including "sister of Auðr" and "sister of Dagr", the personified day. In the same chapter, a work by the 10th century skald Hallfreðr vandræðaskáld is provided that mentions Auðr ("Auðr's splendid sister").

== Theories ==
Scholar Rudolf Simek theorizes that Auðr is the invention of Snorri, but says that Snorri's reason for doing so is unknown. Simek notes that Auðr is a female name in other Icelandic sources. Simek does not mention the skaldic reference to the figure.

== See also ==
- Odal
- Uppsala öd
