= Narfi =

Giant, father of Nótt in Norse mythology

- Norse mythology character

In-universe information
- Alias: Nörfi
- Species: Jötunn
- Gender: Male
- Children: Nótt

Narfi (Old Norse: Old Norse pronunciation: [ˈnɑrve]), also Nörfi (O.N.: Nǫrfi Old Norse pronunciation: [ˈnɔrve]), Nari or Nörr (O.N.: Nǫrr Old Norse pronunciation: [ˈnɔrː]), is a jötunn in Norse mythology, and the father of Nótt, the personified night.

== Name ==
The Old Norse name Nǫrr has been related to the Old Saxon narouua ('night'), a name which occurs in the verse narouua naht an skion of the fragmentary Genesis poem. (Note: See Behaghel, Otto (1933). Heliand und Genesis p. 245. Not in Old English, an error made in de Vries 1962, pp. 414–415, reproduced in Simek 1996, p. 235.) In adjectival form, the Old Norse nǫrr means 'narrow', and the name Nar(f)i may have shared the same meaning.

Thus, the jötunn's name, as first suggested by Adolf Noreen, may be a synonym for "night" or, perhaps more likely, an adjective related to Old English nearwe, "narrow", meaning "closed-in" and thus "oppressive".

Snorri Sturluson cites Narfi as an alternative form of the name of the jötunn Nörfi, and the variants Nör and Nörvi also appear in Norse poetry.

== Attestations ==
According to the Gylfaginning section of Snorri Sturluson's Prose Edda, Nótt is the daughter of the jötunn "Nörfi or Narfi". However, in the Poetic Edda, Nótt's father is called Nörr (not to be confused with Nór), primarily for reasons of alliteration. This name is only recorded in the dative form Nǫrvi (variant spelling Naurvi).

The name of Nótt's father is recorded in several forms in Old Norse sources:

- Naurr, Nörr (dative Naurvi, Nörvi): "Vafþrúðnismál" 25 "Nótt var Naurvi borin", "Alvíssmál" 29 "Nótt in Naurvi kennda".
- Narvi, Narfi: Gylfaginning 10, a poem of Egill Skallagrímsson "niðerfi Narfa".
- Norvi, Nörvi: Gylfaginning 10, "Forspjallsljóð" 7 "kund Nörva".
- Njörfi, Njörvi: Gylfaginning 10, "Sonatorrek" "Njörva nipt".
- Nori: Gylfaginning 10.
- Nari: "Höfuðlausn" 10.
- Neri: "Helgakviða Hundingsbana I", 4.

== Theories ==
Various scholars have argued that Snorri based his genealogy of Nótt on classical models. They relate Narfi to Erebus, which would make nipt Nera, used in "Helgakviða Hundingsbana I" for a Norn who comes in the night, an appellation derived from the Parcae, who were Erebus' daughters.

== Legacy ==
In "A Great Man's Return", a song on their album Valdr Galga, the Swedish Viking metal band Thyrfing refer to "Norve's starfilled sky".

In J. R. R. Tolkien's The Lord of the Rings Part One, The Fellowship of the Ring, the dwarf maker of the Doors of Durin signed them "Narvi"; in drafts, Tolkien spelt the name Narfi as in the Prose Edda.

In a season 13 episode of Supernatural, Narfi captures and sells the archangel Gabriel to Asmodeus.
