= Nótt =

Personification of night in Norse mythology

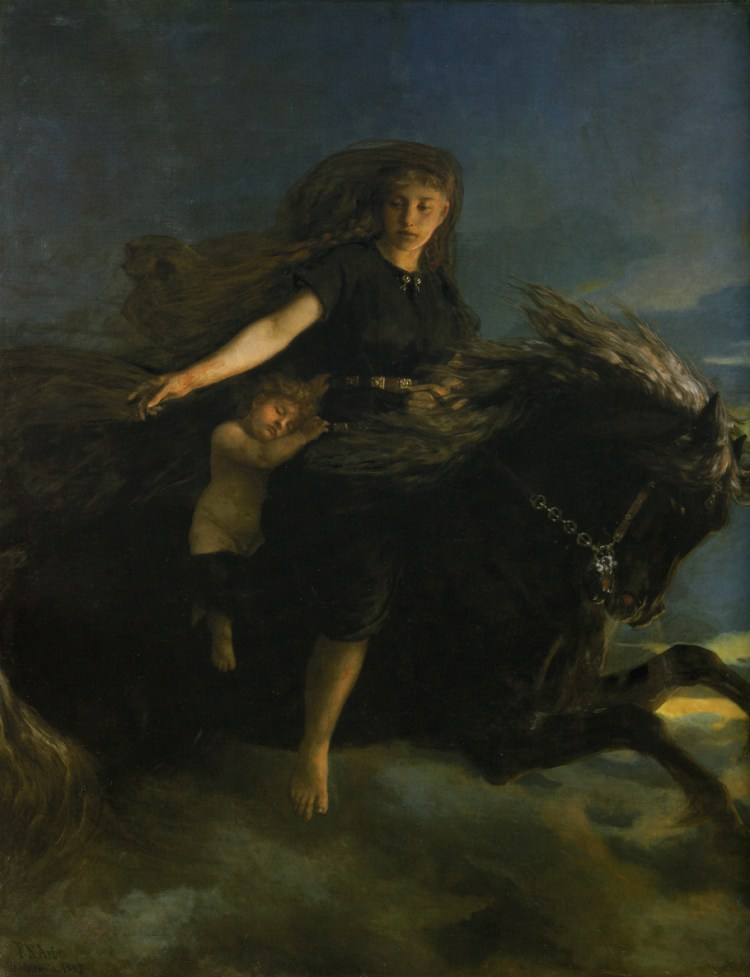
Nótt rides her horse in this 19th-century painting by Peter Nicolai Arbo.

In Norse mythology, Night (Old West Norse: Nótt, [ˈnoːtː]; Old East Norse: Nátt; [ˈnɔːtː]), is a goddess and personification of the night. In both the Poetic Edda, compiled in the 13th century from earlier traditional sources, and the Prose Edda, composed in the 13th century, Nótt is listed as the daughter of a figure by the name of Nörvi (with variant spellings) and is associated with the horse Hrímfaxi, while the Prose Edda features information about Nótt's ancestry, including her three marriages. Nótt's third marriage was to the god Dellingr and this resulted in their son Dagr, the personified day (although some manuscript variations list Jörð as Dellingr's wife and Dagr's mother instead). As a proper noun, the word nótt appears throughout Old Norse literature.

== Attestations ==
=== Poetic Edda ===
In stanza 24 of the poem Vafþrúðnismál, the god Odin (disguised as "Gagnráðr") asks the jötunn Vafþrúðnir from where the day comes, and the night and its tides. In stanza 25, Vafþrúðnir responds:

Delling hight he who the day's father is,
but night was of Nörvi born;
the new and waning moons the beneficent powers created,
to count the years for men.

In stanza 14 of the Vafþrúðnismál, Odin states that the horse Hrímfaxi "draws every night to the beneficent gods" and that he lets foam from his bit fall every morning, from which dew comes to the valleys. In stanza 30 of the poem Alvíssmál, the god Thor asks the dwarf Alvíss to tell him what night is called in each of the nine worlds, whom "Nórr" birthed. Alvíss responds that night is referred as "night" by mankind, "darkness" by the gods, "the masker" by the mighty Powers, "unlight" by the jötunn, "joy-of-sleep" by the elves, while dwarves call her "dream-Njörun" (meaning "dream-goddess").

In Sigrdrífumál, after the valkyrie Sigrdrífa is woken from her sleep curse by the hero Sigurd, Sigurd asks her name, and she gives him a "memory-drink" of a drinking horn full of mead, and then Sigrdrifa says a prayer. The first verse of this prayer features a reference to the "sons of Dagr" and the "daughter of Nótt":

Hail to the Day! Hail to the sons of Day!
To Night and her daughter hail!
With placid eyes behold us here,
and here sitting give us victory.

Hail to the Æsir! Hail to the Asyniur!
Hail to the bounteous earth!
Words and wisdom give to us noble twain,
and healing hands while we live!

=== Prose Edda ===
In the Prose Edda book Gylfaginning, Nótt is again personified. In chapter 10, the enthroned figure of High states that Nótt is the daughter of a jötunn from Jötunheimr by the name of "Norfi or Narfi". Nótt is described as "black and swarthy", and has had three marriages. Her first marriage was with Naglfari, and the two produced a son by the name of Auðr. Nótt's second marriage was to Annar, resulting in their daughter Jörð, the personified earth. Finally, Nótt marries the god Dellingr, and the couple have Dagr, who takes after his "father's people" in brightness and fairness. Odin took Nótt and her son Dagr, placed them into the sky with a chariot and a horse each, and they ride around the Earth every 24 hours. Nótt rides before Dagr, and foam from her horse Hrímfaxi's bit sprinkles the Earth.

However, scholar Haukur Thorgeirsson points out that the four manuscripts of Gylfaginning vary in their descriptions of the family relations between Nótt, Jörð, Dagr, and Dellingr. In other words, depending on the manuscript, either Jörð or Nátt is the mother of Dagr and partner of Dellingr. Haukur details that "the oldest manuscript, U, offers a version where Jǫrð is married to Dellingr and the mother of Dagr while the other manuscripts, R, W and T, cast Nótt in the role of Dellingr's wife and Dagr's mother", and argues that "the version in U came about accidentally when the writer of U or its antecedent shortened a text similar to that in RWT. The results of this accident made their way into the Icelandic poetic tradition".

In the Prose Edda book Skáldskaparmál, means of referring to Jörð are provided, including "daughter of Nótt". Chapter 58 states that "Hrimfaxi or Fiorsvartnir draw the night", and in chapter 64, "nótt" is stated as one of various words for time and a version of the Alvíssmál passage is cited.

== See also ==
- List of night deities
