= Dagr =

Personification of day in Norse mythology

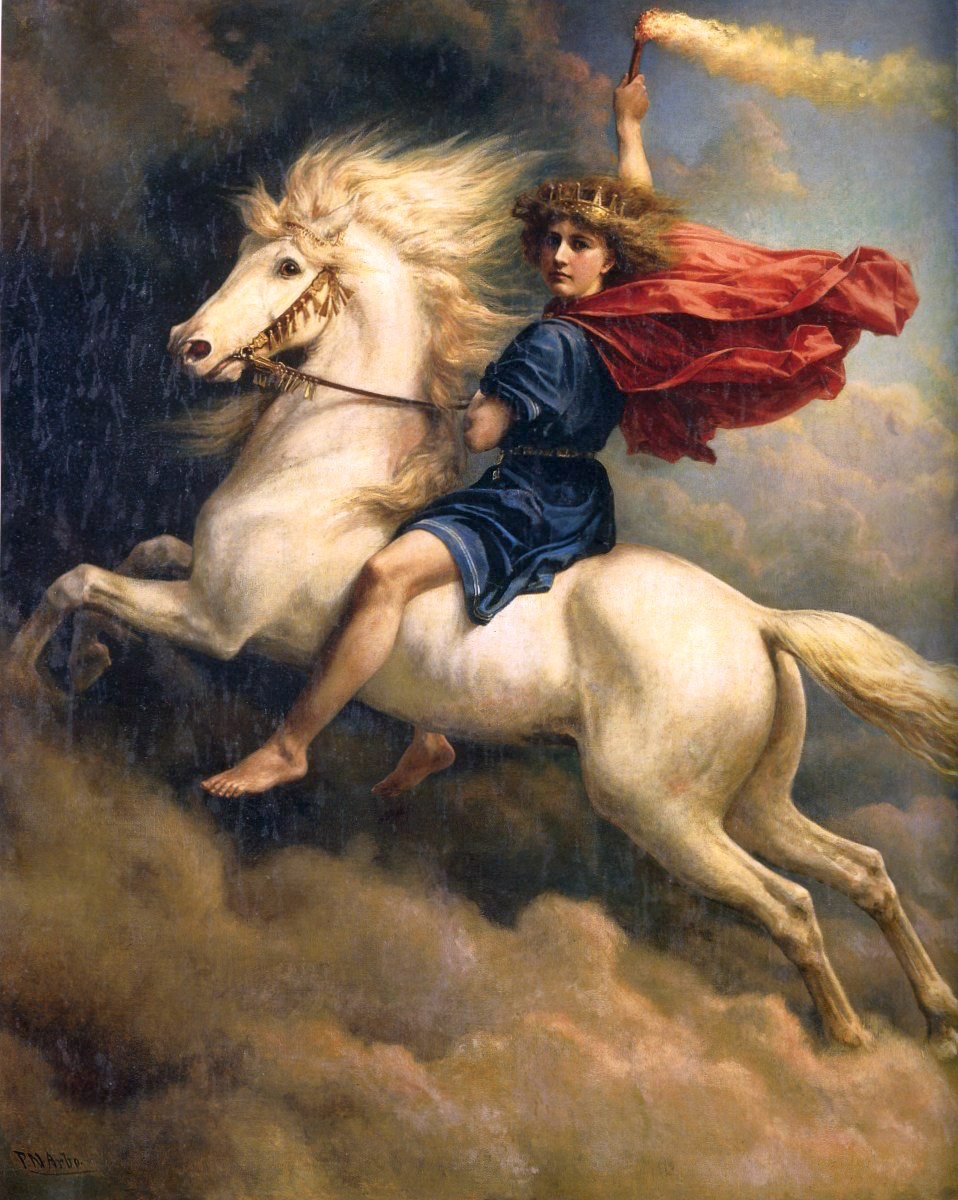
Dagr (1874) by Peter Nicolai Arbo

Dagr (Old Norse 'day') is the divine personification of the day in Norse mythology. He appears in the Poetic Edda, compiled in the 13th century from earlier traditional sources, and the Prose Edda, written in the 13th century by Snorri Sturluson. In both sources, Dagr is stated to be the son of the god Dellingr and is associated with the bright-maned horse Skinfaxi, who "draw[s] day to mankind". Depending on manuscript variation, the Prose Edda adds that Dagr is either Dellingr's son by Nótt, the personified night, or Jörð, the personified Earth. Otherwise, Dagr appears as a common noun simply meaning "day" throughout Old Norse works. Connections have been proposed between Dagr and other similarly named figures in Germanic mythology.

== Eddaic Dagr ==
=== Poetic Edda ===
Dagr is mentioned in stanzas 12 and 25 of the poem Vafþrúðnismál. In stanza 24, the god Odin (disguised as "Gagnráðr") asks the jötunn Vafþrúðnir from where the day comes, and the night and its tides. In stanza 25, Vafþrúðnir responds:

Delling hight he who the day's father is,
but night was of Nörvi born;
the new and waning moons the beneficent powers created,
to count the years for men.

In stanza 12, the horse Skinfaxi, his mane gleaming, is stated by Vafþrúðnir as "drawing day to mankind".

In Sigrdrífumál, after the valkyrie Sigrdrífa is woken from her sleep curse by the hero Sigurd, Sigurd asks her name, and she gives him a "memory-drink" of a drinking horn full of mead, and then Sigrdrifa says a prayer. The first verse of this prayer features a reference to the "sons of Dagr" and the "female relative" (nipt, "niece" or "daughter") of Nótt.

In the poem Hrafnagaldr Óðins, the appearance of Dagr and his horse and chariot are described:

The son of Delling
urged on his horse
adorned with
precious jewels.
Over Mannheim shines
the horse's mane,
the steed Dvalin's deluder
dew in his chariot.

=== Prose Edda ===
In the Prose Edda book Gylfaginning, Dagr is again personified. In chapter 10, the enthroned figure of High states that Dagr is the son of the couple of Dellingr of the Æsir and his wife Nótt ("night"). Dagr is described as "as bright and beautiful as his father's people". Odin took Dagr and his mother Nótt, gave them each a chariot and a horse — Dagr receiving the horse Skinfaxi, whose mane illuminates all the sky and the Earth — and placed them in the sky to ride around the Earth every 24 hours.

Dagr is again personified in chapter 24 of the Prose Edda book Skáldskaparmál, where he is stated as a brother of Jörð. As a common noun, Dagr appears in chapter 58, where "Skinfaxi or Glad" is stated as pulling forth the day, and chapter 64, where Dagr is stated as one of various words for time.

However, scholar Haukur Thorgeirsson points out that the four manuscripts of Gylfaginning vary in their descriptions of the family relations between Nótt, Jörð, Dagr, and Dellingr. In other words, depending on the manuscript, either Jörð or Nótt is the mother of Dagr and partner of Dellingr. Haukur details that "the oldest manuscript, U, offers a version where Jǫrð is the wife of Dellingr and the mother of Dagr while the other manuscripts, R, W and T, cast Nótt in the role of Dellingr's wife and Dagr's mother", and argues that "the version in U came about accidentally when the writer of U or its antecedent shortened a text similar to that in RWT. The results of this accident made their way into the Icelandic poetic tradition".

== Svipdagr ==
Otto Höfler theorized that Dagr may be related to (or may be the same figure as) the hero Svipdagr (whose name means "the suddenly dawning day") who is attested in various texts. Among other sources, this figure is found in two poems compiled together and known as Svipdagsmál in the Poetic Edda, the Prologue to the Prose Edda, and by the name Swæfdæg in the mythical genealogies of the Anglian houses of Anglo-Saxon England. Otto Höfler also proposed that Svipdagr may have been a "Dagr of the Suebi", and because of the names of his family members, Sólbjartr ("the sun-light", indicating a potential god of the skies) and Gróa ("growth", indicating a possible goddess of growth), and his wooing of Menglöð (often identified with the goddess Freyja), he further suggested that Svipdagr may have been a fertility god.

== See also ==
- Dagaz, the d rune
- Dag the Wise
- Dies (deity)
- Hemera
