= Night =

Period of darkness

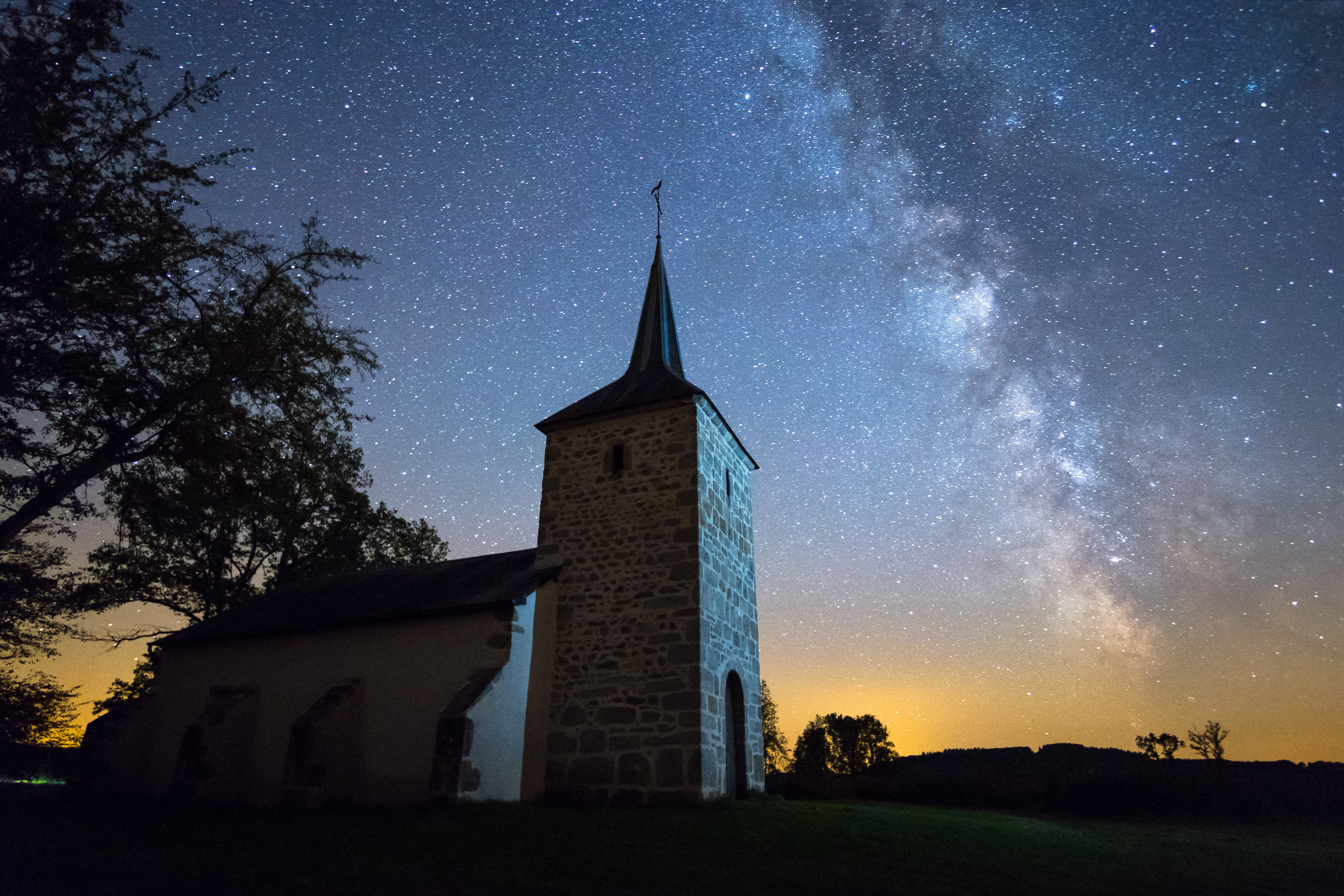
A French chapel under a starry night sky, with the Milky Way visible and skyglow over the horizon

Night, or nighttime, is the period of darkness when the Sun is below the horizon. Daylight illuminates one side of Earth, leaving the other in darkness. The opposite of nighttime is daytime. Earth's rotation causes the appearance of sunrise and sunset. Moonlight, airglow, starlight, and light pollution dimly illuminate night. The duration of day, night, and twilight varies depending on the time of year and the observer's latitude.

Night on other celestial bodies is affected by their rotation and orbital periods. The planets Mercury and Venus have much longer nights than Earth. On Venus, night lasts about 58 Earth days. The Moon's rotation is tidally locked, rotating so that one of the sides of the Moon always faces Earth. Nightfall across portions of the near side of the Moon results in lunar phases visible from Earth.

Organisms respond to the changes brought by nightfall: darkness, lower temperatures, and higher humidity. Their responses include direct reactions and adjustments to circadian rhythms governed by an internal biological clock. These circadian rhythms, regulated by exposure to light and darkness, affect an organism's behavior and physiology. Animals more active at night are called nocturnal and have adaptations for low light, including different forms of night vision and the heightening of other senses. Diurnal animals are active during the day and sleep at night; mammals, birds, and some others dream while asleep.

Fungi respond directly to nightfall and increase their biomass. With some exceptions, fungi do not rely on a biological clock. Plants store energy produced through photosynthesis as starch granules to consume at night. Algae engage in a similar process, and cyanobacteria transition from photosynthesis to nitrogen fixation after sunset. In arid environments like deserts, plants evolved to be more active at night, with many gathering carbon dioxide overnight for daytime photosynthesis. Night-blooming cacti rely on nocturnal pollinators such as bats and moths for reproduction. Light pollution disrupts the patterns in ecosystems and is especially harmful to night-flying insects.

Historically, night has been a time of increased danger and insecurity. Many daytime social controls dissipated after sunset. Theft, fights, murders, taboo sexual activities, and accidental deaths all became more frequent due in part to reduced visibility. Despite a reduction in urban dangers, the majority of violent crime is still committed after dark. According to psychologists, the widespread fear of the dark and the night stems from these dangers. The fear remains common to the present day, especially among children.

Cultures have personified night through deities associated with some or all of these aspects of nighttime. The folklore of many cultures contains "creatures of the night", including werewolves, witches, ghosts, and goblins, reflecting societal fears and anxieties.

The introduction of artificial lighting extended daytime activities. Major European cities hung lanterns housing candles and oil lamps in the 1600s. Nineteenth-century gas and electric lights created unprecedented illumination. The range of socially acceptable leisure activities expanded, and various industries introduced a night shift. Nightlife – encompassing bars, nightclubs, and cultural venues – has become a significant part of urban culture, contributing to social and political movements.

== Etymology ==
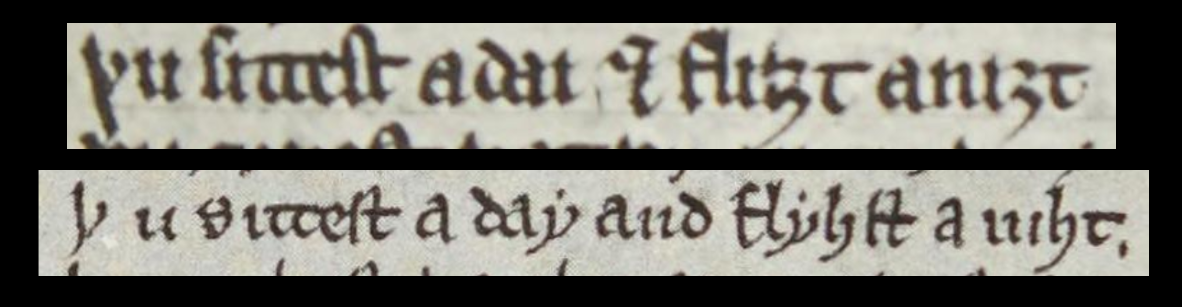
Variable spellings of night in a Middle English poem: Þu sittest a dai & fliȝst a niȝt (top); Þu sittest a day and flyhst a niht (bottom); 'You sit by day and fly by night'

The word night is derived from the Old English niht. Both words are Germanic and cognates of the German nacht. The terms belong to a family of night words present in nearly all European languages, derived from an Indo-European word, reconstructed as *nekwt. The original root is thought most likely to be *nek-, a term relating to death. According to the nineteenth-century British philologist Walter William Skeat, this root meant 'to perish', 'to disappear', or 'to fail', with night being the point where light ceased and perished. More recently, Roland Pooth has argued for the root term to be understood to mean 'empty' or 'naked', with night being the point where the sky is naked and empty of light. As a result of this early origin, night shares its root with the Latin nox, the root of many English terms connected to the night, such as equinox and nocturnal.

Cognates of day are less widespread. Philologist Ernest Weekley attributed the many related night words to the early practice of measuring time in nights rather than days. The term fortnight, an Old English contraction of "fourteen nights", is a remnant of this ancient custom of measuring time in nights.

The letters "gh" were added to the word to represent the yogh character (Ȝ), unavailable on printing presses imported from continental Europe in the fifteenth and sixteenth centuries. As English speakers ceased to pronounce the yogh, the "gh" became silent. A similar process occurred in many English words, such as light.

== Astronomy ==
A planet's rotation causes nighttime and daytime. When a place on Earth is pointed away from the Sun, that location experiences night. The Sun appears to set in the West and rise in the East due to Earth's rotation. Many celestial bodies, including the other planets in the solar system, have a form of night.

=== Earth ===
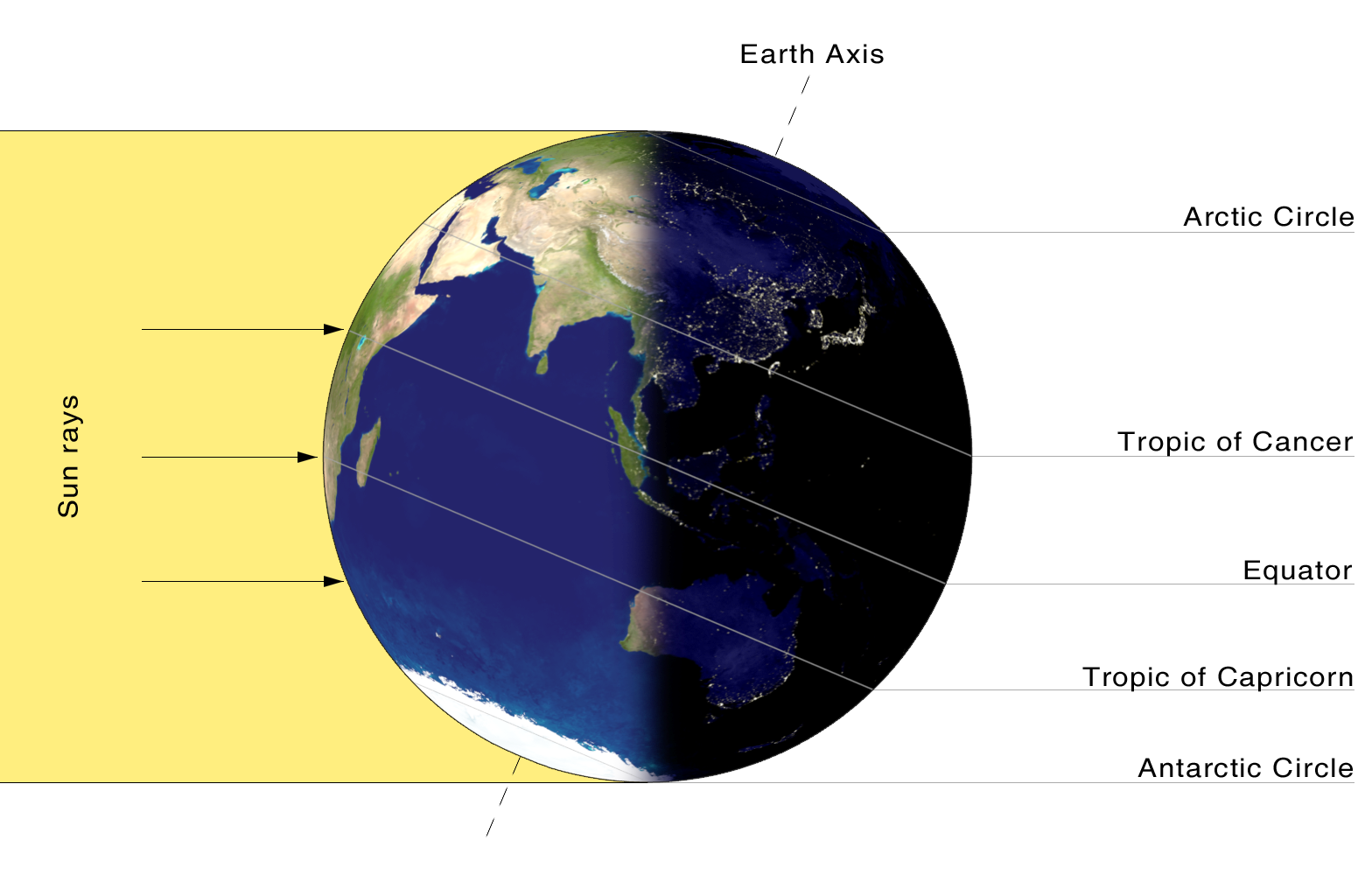
Day and night during the winter solstice in the northern hemisphere

The length of night on Earth varies depending on the time of year. Longer nights occur in winter, with the winter solstice being the longest. Nights are shorter in the summer, with the summer solstice being the shortest. Earth orbits the Sun on an axis tilted 23.44 degrees. Nights are longer when a hemisphere is tilted away from the Sun and shorter when a hemisphere is tilted toward the Sun. As a result, the longest night of the year for the Northern Hemisphere will be the shortest night of the year for the Southern Hemisphere.

Night's duration varies least near the equator. The difference between the shortest and longest night increases approaching the poles. At the equator, night lasts roughly 12 hours throughout the year. The tropics have little difference in the length of day and night. At the 45th parallel, the longest winter night is roughly twice as long as the shortest summer night. Within the polar circles, night will last the full 24 hours of the winter solstice. The length of this polar night increases closer to the poles. Utqiagvik, Alaska, the northernmost point in the United States, experiences 65 days of polar night. At the pole itself, polar night lasts 179 days from September to March.

Diagram of atmospheric refraction at sunrise and sunset

Over a year, there is more daytime than nighttime because of the Sun's size and atmospheric refraction. The Sun is not a single point. Viewed from Earth, the Sun ranges in angular diameter from 31 to 33 arcminutes. When the center of the Sun falls to the western horizon, half of the Sun will still be visible during sunset. Likewise, by the time the center of the Sun rises to the eastern horizon, half of the Sun will already be visible during sunrise. This shortens night by about three minutes in temperate zones. Atmospheric refraction is a larger factor. Refraction bends sunlight over the horizon. On Earth, the Sun remains briefly visible after it has geometrically fallen below the horizon. This shortens night by about six minutes. Scattered, diffuse sunlight remains in the sky after sunset and into twilight.

==== Twilight ====
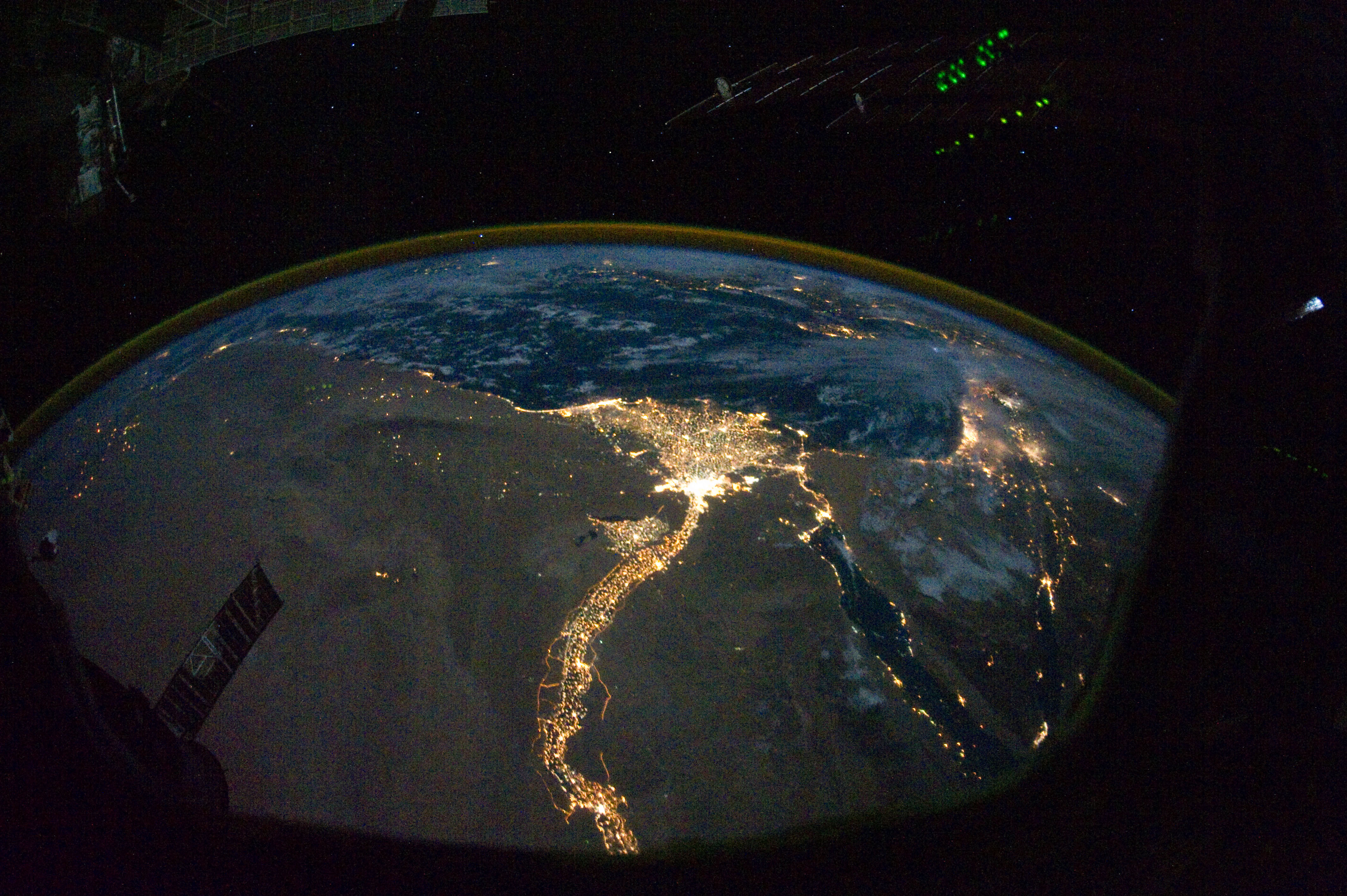
The drainage basin of the Nile River and delta at night

Twilight is the period of transition between daylight and darkness, specifically when the Sun is below the horizon. Civil twilight occurs when the Sun is between 0° and 6° below the horizon, during which nearby planets and bright stars, like Venus and Sirius respectively, are visible. Nautical twilight continues until the Sun is 12° below the horizon, during which the horizon is visible just enough for navigation. Astronomical twilight continues until the Sun has sunk 18° below the horizon, beyond which refracted sunlight is no longer visible. The period when the sun is 18° or more below either horizon is called astronomical night.

Similar to the duration of night itself, the duration of twilight varies according to latitude. At the equator, day quickly transitions to night, while the transition can take weeks near the poles. The duration of twilight is longest at the summer solstice and shortest near the equinoxes. Moonlight, starlight, airglow, and light pollution can dimly illuminate the nighttime, with their diffuse aspects being termed skyglow. The amount of skyglow increases each year due to artificial lighting.

=== Other celestial bodies ===
The Moon's phases at hourly intervals throughout 2020, as viewed from the Northern Hemisphere

Night exists on the other planets and moons in the Solar System. The length of night is affected by the rotation period and orbital period of the celestial object. The lunar phases visible from Earth result from nightfall on the Moon. The Moon has longer nights than Earth, lasting about two weeks. This is half of the synodic lunar month, the time it takes the Moon to cycle through its phases. The Moon is tidally locked to Earth; it rotates so that one side of the Moon always faces the Earth. The side of the Moon facing away from Earth is called the far side of the Moon, and the side facing Earth is called the near side of the Moon. During lunar night on the near side, Earth appears 50 times brighter than a full moon appears from Earth. Because the Moon has no atmosphere, there is an abrupt transition from day to night without twilight.

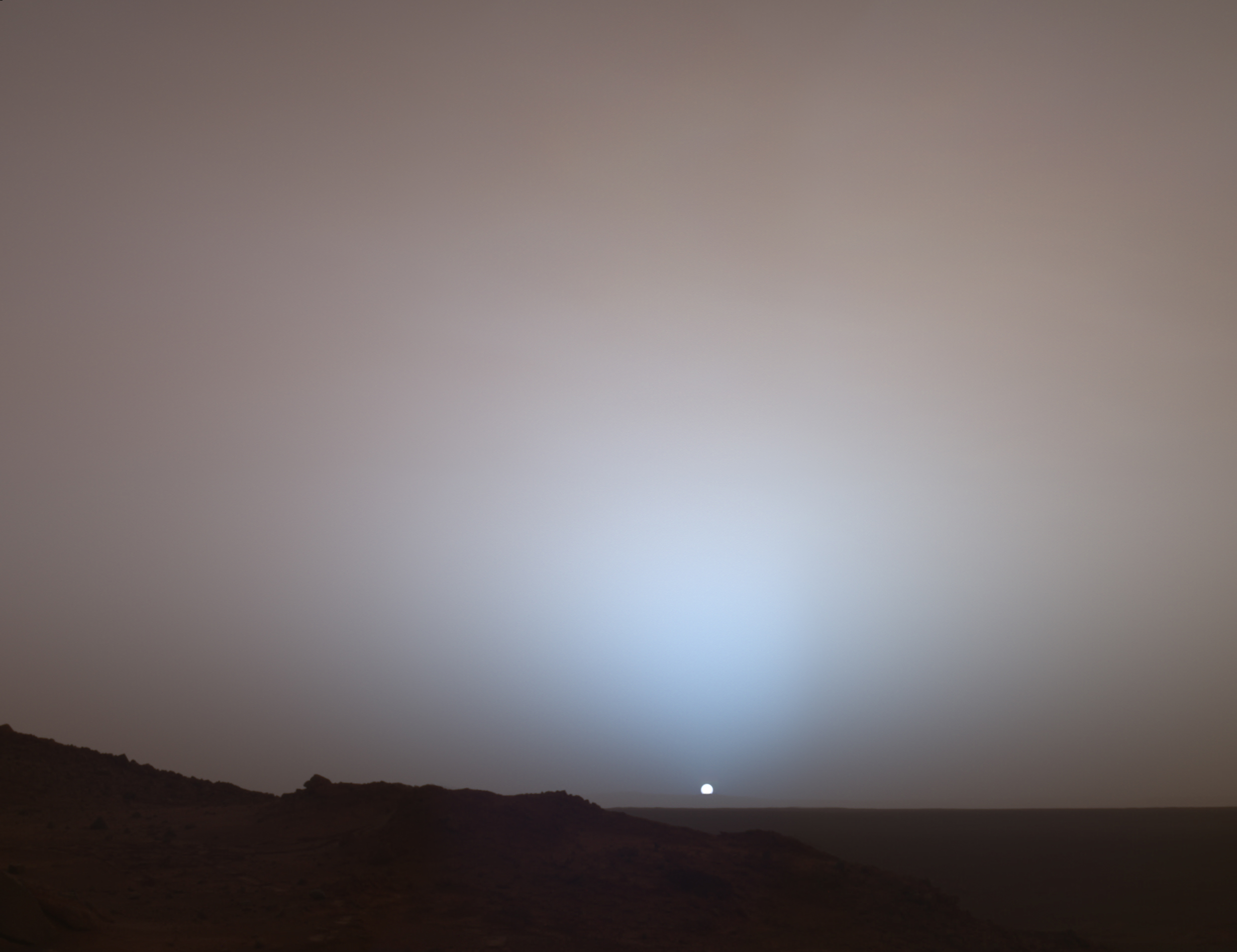
Sunset on Mars

Night varies from planet to planet within the Solar System. Mars's dusty atmosphere causes a lengthy twilight period. The refracted light ranges from purple to blue, often resulting in glowing noctilucent clouds. Venus and Mercury have long nights because of their slow rotational periods. The planet Venus rotates once every 243 Earth days. Because of its unusual retrograde rotation, nights last just over 58 Earth days. The dense greenhouse atmosphere on Venus keeps its surface hot enough to melt lead throughout the night. Its planetary wind system, driven by solar heat, reverses direction from day to night. Venus's winds flow from the equator to the poles on the day side and from the poles to the equator on the night side. On Mercury, the planet closest to the Sun, the temperature drops by over 1,000 °F (538 °C) after nightfall.

The day–night cycle is one consideration for planetary habitability or the possibility of extraterrestrial life on distant exoplanets. In general, shorter nights result in a higher equilibrium temperature for the planet. On an Earth-like planet, longer day–night cycles may increase habitability up to a point. Computer models show that longer nights would affect Hadley circulation, resulting in a cooler, less cloudy planet. Once the rotation speed of a planet slows beyond 1/16 that of Earth, the difference in day-to-night temperature shifts increases dramatically. Some exoplanets, like those of TRAPPIST-1, are tidally locked. Tidally locked planets have equal rotation and orbital periods, so one side experiences constant day, and the other side constant night. In these situations, astrophysicists believe that life would most likely develop in the twilight zone between the day and night hemispheres.

== Biology ==
The giant moray eel is most active by night. Its brain has adapted to rely less on visual input and more on its sense of smell.

Living organisms react directly to the darkness of night. Light and darkness also affect circadian rhythms, the physical and mental changes that occur in a 24-hour cycle. This daily cycle is regulated by an internal "biological clock" that is adjusted by exposure to light. The length and timing of nighttime depend on location and time of year. Organisms that are more active at night possess adaptations to the night's dimmer light, increased humidity, and lower temperatures.

=== Animals ===
Animals that are active primarily at night are called nocturnal and usually possess adaptations for night vision. In vertebrates' eyes, two types of photoreceptor cells sense light. Cone cells sense color but are ineffective in low light; rod cells sense only brightness but remain effective in very dim light. The eyes of nocturnal animals have a greater percentage of rod cells. In most mammals, rod cells contain densely packed DNA near the edge of the nucleus. For nocturnal mammals, this is reversed with the densely packed DNA in the center of the nucleus, which reduces the scattering of light. Some nocturnal animals have a mirror, the tapetum lucidum, behind the retina. This doubles the amount of light their eyes can process.

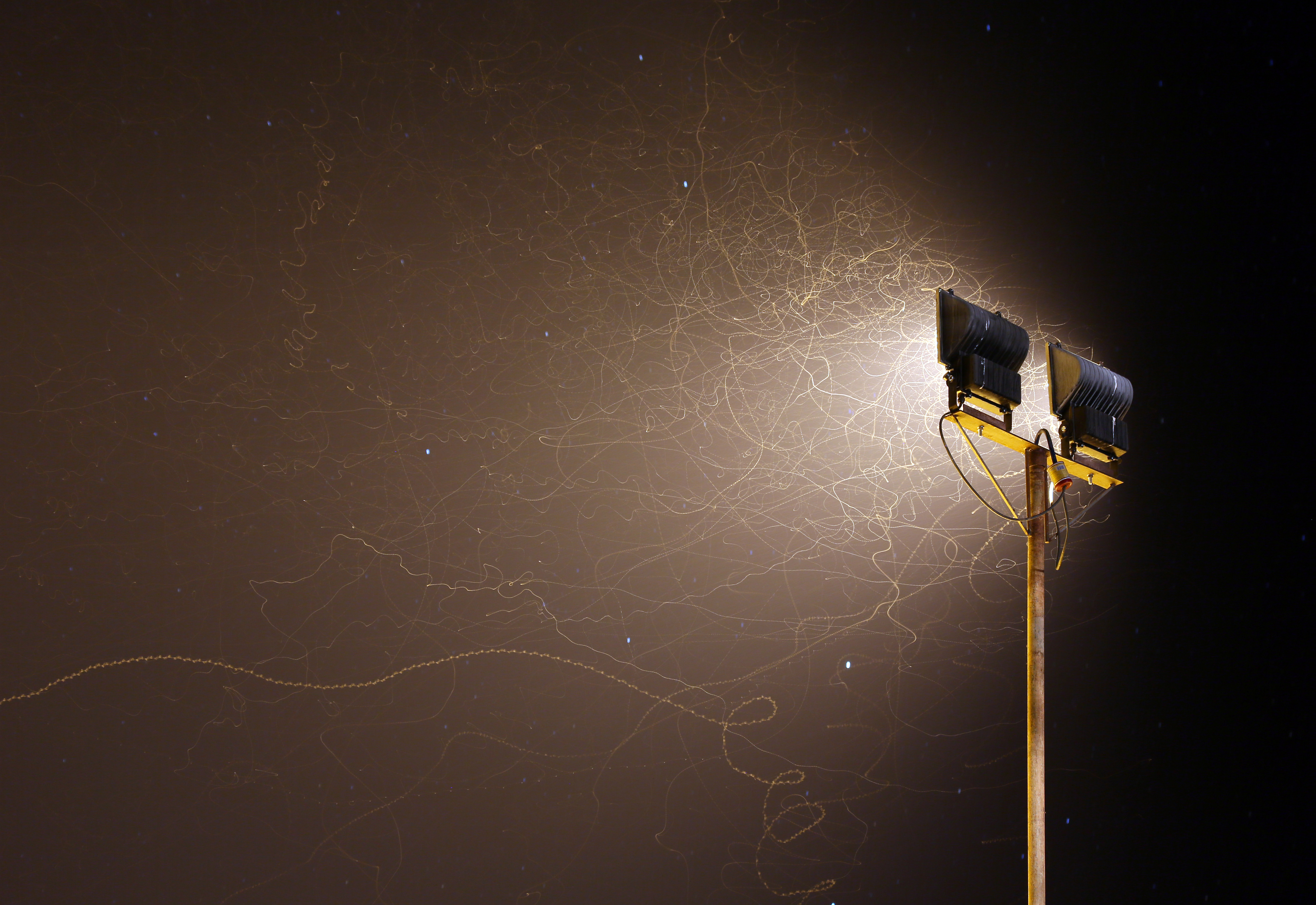
Nocturnal insects drawn to an artificial light

The compound eyes of insects can see at even lower levels of light. For example, the elephant hawk moth can see in color, including ultraviolet, with only starlight. Nocturnal insects navigate using moonlight, lunar phases, infrared vision, the position of the stars, and the Earth's magnetic field. Artificial lighting disrupts the biorhythms of many animals. Night-flying insects that use the moon for navigation are especially vulnerable to disorientation from increasing levels of artificial lighting. Artificial lights attract many night-flying insects that die from exhaustion and nocturnal predators. Decreases in insect populations disrupt the overall ecosystem because their larvae are a key food source for smaller fish. Dark-sky advocate Paul Bogard described the unnatural migration of night-flying insects from the unlit Nevada desert into Las Vegas as "like sparkling confetti floating in the beam's white column".

Time-expanded recording of a bat using echolocation to home in on its prey

Some nocturnal animals have developed other senses to compensate for limited light. Many snakes have a pit organ that senses infrared light and enables them to detect heat. Nocturnal mice possess a vomeronasal organ that enhances their sense of smell. Bats heavily depend on echolocation. Echolocation allows an animal to navigate with their sense of hearing by emitting sounds and listening for the time it takes them to bounce back. Bats emit a steady stream of clicks while hunting insects and home in on prey as thin as human hair.

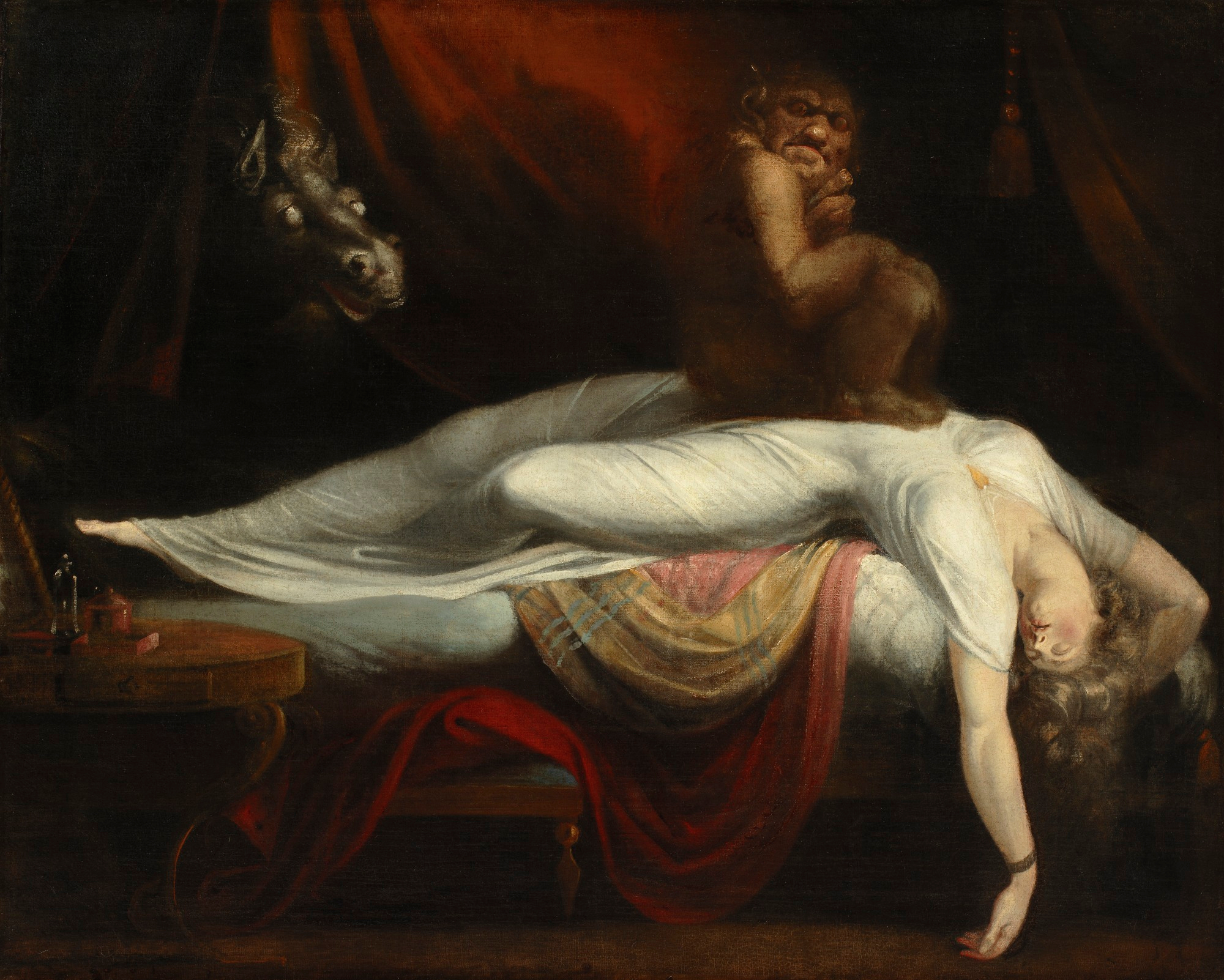
Fuseli's The Nightmare

People and other diurnal animals sleep primarily at night. Humans, other mammals, and birds experience multiple stages of sleep visible via electroencephalography. The stages of sleep are wakefulness, three stages of non-rapid eye movement sleep (NREM), including deep sleep, and rapid eye movement (REM) sleep. During REM sleep, dreams are more frequent and complex. Studies show that some reptiles may also experience REM sleep. During deep sleep, memories are consolidated into long-term memory. Invertebrates most likely experience a form of sleep as well. Studies on bees, which have complex brain structures unrelated to vertebrate brains, have shown improvements in memory after sleep, similar to mammals.

Compared to waking life, dreams are sparse with limited sensory detail. Dreams are hallucinatory or bizarre, and they often have a narrative structure. Many hypotheses exist to explain the function of dreams without a definitive answer. Nightmares are dreams that cause distress. The word "night-mare" originally referred to nocturnal demons that were believed to assail sleeping dreamers, like the incubus (male) or succubus (female). It was believed that the demons could sit upon a dreamer's chest to suffocate a victim, as depicted in John Henry Fuseli's The Nightmare.

=== Fungi ===
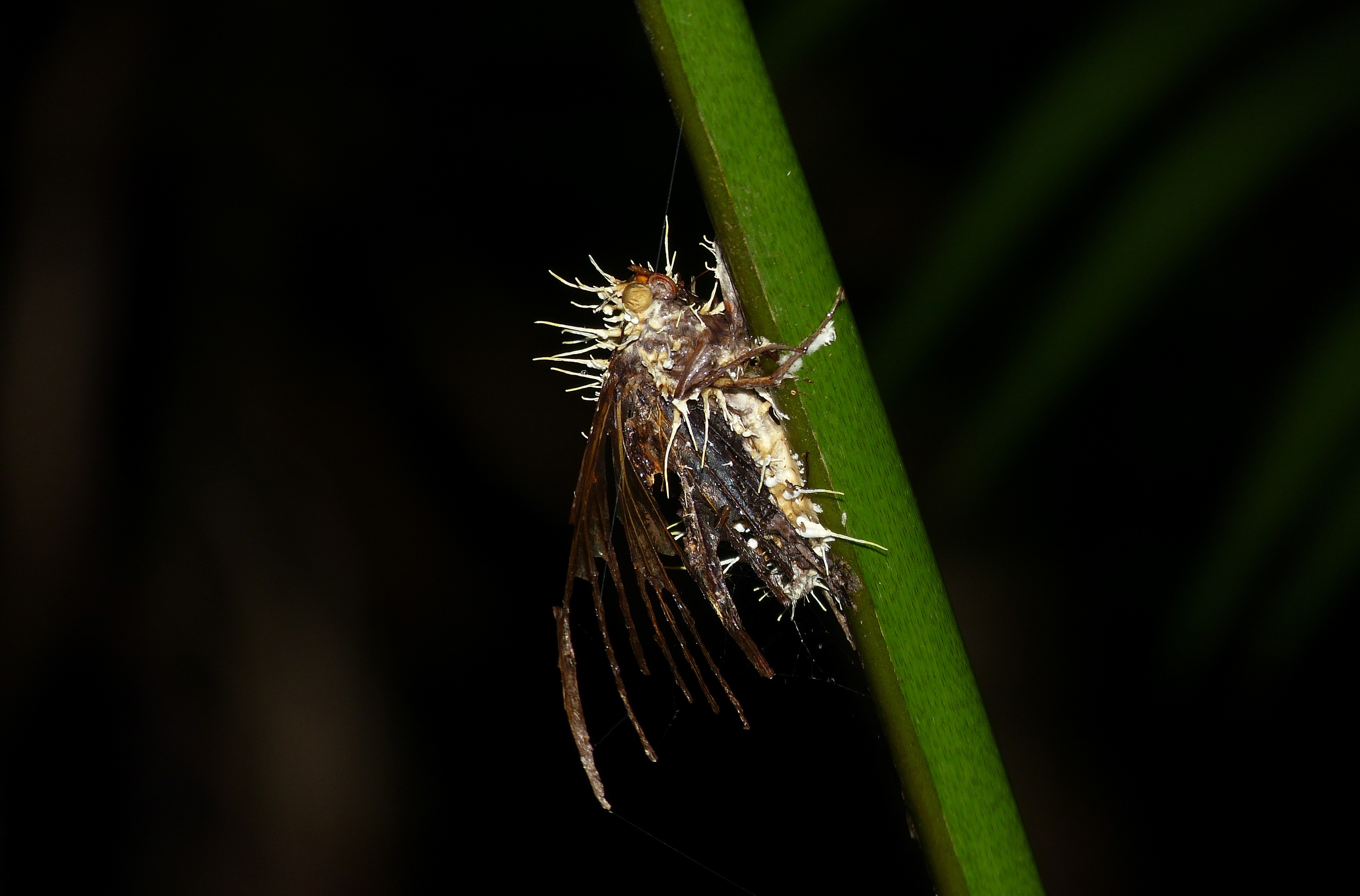
An entomopathogenic fungus extends fruiting bodies from its host.

Fungi can sense the presence and absence of light, and the nightly changes of most fungi growth and biological processes are direct responses to either darkness or falling temperatures. By night, fungi are more engaged in synthesizing cellular components and increasing their biomass. For example, fungi that prey on insects will infect the central nervous system of their prey, allowing the fungi to control the actions of the dying insect. During the late afternoon, the fungi will pilot their prey to higher elevations where wind currents can carry its spores further, and at night, will kill and digest the insect, extending fruiting bodies from the host's exoskeleton. Most fungi do not have true circadian rhythms. The bread mold Neurospora crassa is used to study biorhythms because it is one of the few species of fungi to rely on an internal clock rather than directly on environmental changes.

=== Plants ===
Time-lapse video of a night-blooming cereus

During the day, plants engage in photosynthesis and release oxygen. By night, plants engage in respiration, consuming oxygen and releasing carbon dioxide. Plants can draw up more water after sunset, which facilitates new leaf growth. As plants cannot create energy through photosynthesis after sunset, they use energy stored in the plant, typically as starch granules. Plants use this stored energy at a steady rate, depleting their reserves almost right at dawn. Plants will adjust their rate of consumption to match the expected time until sunrise. This avoids prematurely running out of starch reserves, and it allows the plant to adjust for longer nights in the winter. If a plant is subjected to artificially early darkness, it will ration its energy consumption to last until dawn.

Succulent plants, including cacti, have adapted to the limited water availability in arid environments like deserts. The stomata of cacti do not open until night. When the temperature drops, the pores open to allow the cacti to store carbon dioxide for photosynthesis the next day, a process known as crassulacean acid metabolism (CAM). Cacti and night-blooming plants use CAM to store up to 99% of the carbon dioxide they use in daily photosynthesis. Ceroid cacti often have flowers that bloom at night and fade before sunrise. As few bees are nocturnal, night-flowering plants rely on other pollinators, including moths, beetles, and bats. These flowers rely more on the pollinators' sense of smell, with strong perfumes to attract moths and foul-smelling odors to attract bats.

Eukaryotic and prokaryotic organisms that engage in photosynthesis are also affected by nightfall. Like plants, algae will switch to taking in oxygen and processing energy stored as starch. Cyanobacteria switch from photosynthesis to nitrogen fixation after sunset. They also absorb genetic material from their environment at a higher rate during the night.

== Culture ==
=== History and technology ===
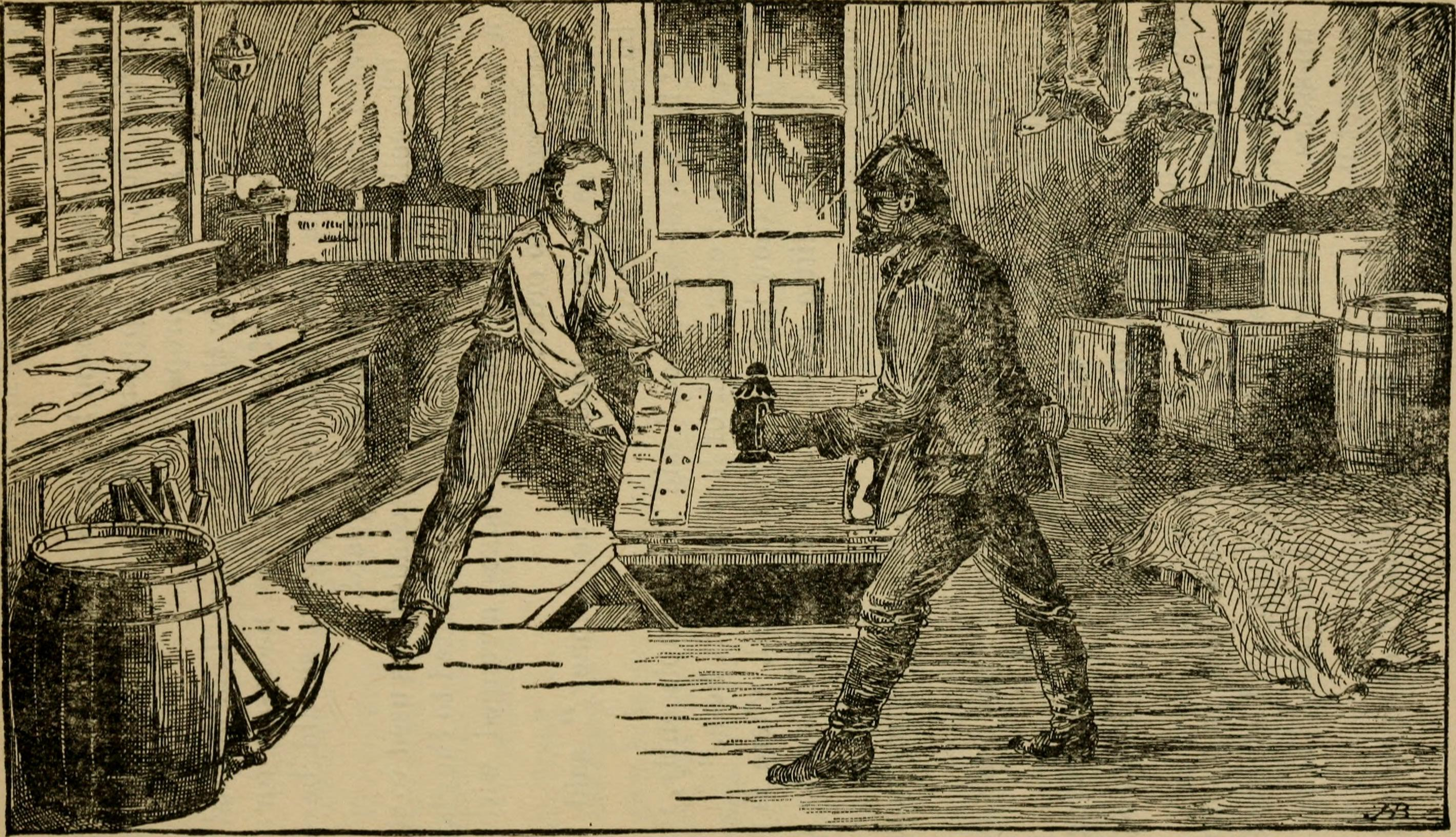
An illustration from Horatio Alger's Tom Temple's Career shows a burglar using a "dark lantern", which shines in only one direction.

Before the industrial era, night was a time of heightened insecurity. Fear of the night was common but varied in intensity across cultures. Some psychologists have concluded that prehistoric people feared real and tangible harms present during the night and that these concrete fears developed into a broader fear of night itself.

Dangers increased due to lower visibility. Injuries and deaths were caused by drowning and falling into pits, ditches, and shafts. People were less able to evaluate others after dark. Due to nocturnal alcohol consumption and the anonymity of darkness, quarrels were more likely to escalate to violence. For example, in medieval Stockholm, the majority of murders were committed while intoxicated.

Crime and fear of crime increased at night. In pre-industrial Europe, criminals disguised themselves with hats, face paint, or cloaks. Thieves would trip pedestrians with ropes laid across streets and dismount horse riders using long poles extended from the roadside shadows. They used "dark lanterns" where light could be shined through a single side. Most nocturnal thieves worked alone; organized criminal gangs were uncommon except for burglary. With members numbering into the dozens and hundreds, burglary rings hacked, cut, smashed, and burrowed into homes when residents were sleeping. They used a range of brutality to subdue and intimidate the residents, with the French chauffeurs infamously torturing victims with fire. With nothing comparable to a modern police force, these burglary gangs then escaped into the night, often disguised as demons, ghosts, or monsters. Burglary rings also employed arson both to create distraction and to flush people from their locked homes.

Early sources of heat and illumination (such as chimneys, candles, and oil lamps) created inherent fire risks while families slept. Additionally, bakers and brewers kept fires constantly burning near stacks of wood and charcoal. Cities and towns regularly burned to the ground. One English town, Stratford-upon-Avon, was consumed by fire four times in five years. The increased humidity of night was deemed the result of vapors and fumes. The annual movements of stars and constellations across the night sky were used to track the passage of time, but other changes in the night sky were interpreted as significant omens.

Many daytime religious, governmental, and local social controls dissipated after nightfall. Fortified Christian communities announced the coming darkness with horns, church bells, or drums. This alerted residents—like peasants working in the fields—to return home before the city gates shut. The English engaged in a daily process of "shutting in", where valuables were brought into homes before they were bolted, barred, locked, and shuttered. Many English and European towns attempted to impose curfews during the medieval period and gradually loosened the restrictions via exceptions. Prayer and folk magic were more common by night. Amulets were hung to ward off nightmares, spells were cast against thievery, and pig hearts were hung in chimneys to block demons from traveling down them. The common phrase "good night" has been shortened from "God give you a good night." In Ottoman Istanbul, the royal palaces shifted to projecting nocturnal power through large parties lit by lanterns, candles, and fireworks. Though alcohol was forbidden for Muslims, after dark, Turkish Muslims went to bars and taverns beyond the Muslim areas.

The night has long been a time of increased sexual activity, especially in taboo forms such as premarital, extramarital, gay, and lesbian sex. In colonial New England courtship, young unmarried couples practiced bundling before marriage. The couples would lie down in the woman's bed, her family would wrap them tightly with blankets, and they would spend the night together this way. Some families took precautions to prevent unintended pregnancies, like sleeping in the same room, laying a large wooden board between the couple, or pulling a single stocking over both of their daughter's legs. Historian Roger Ekirch described pre-industrial night as a "sanctuary from ordinary existence."

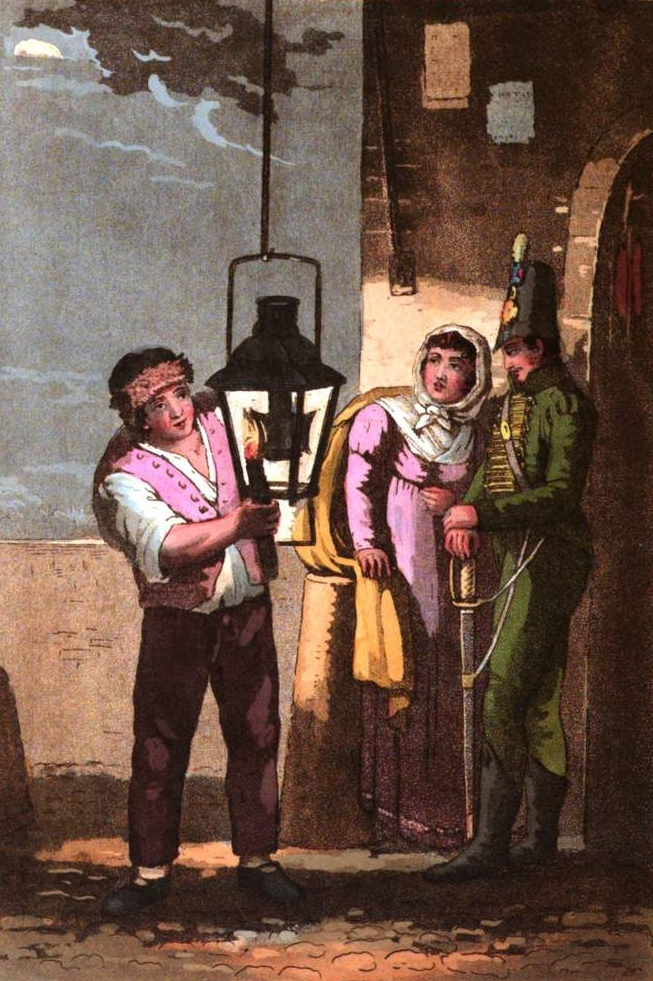
Lantern

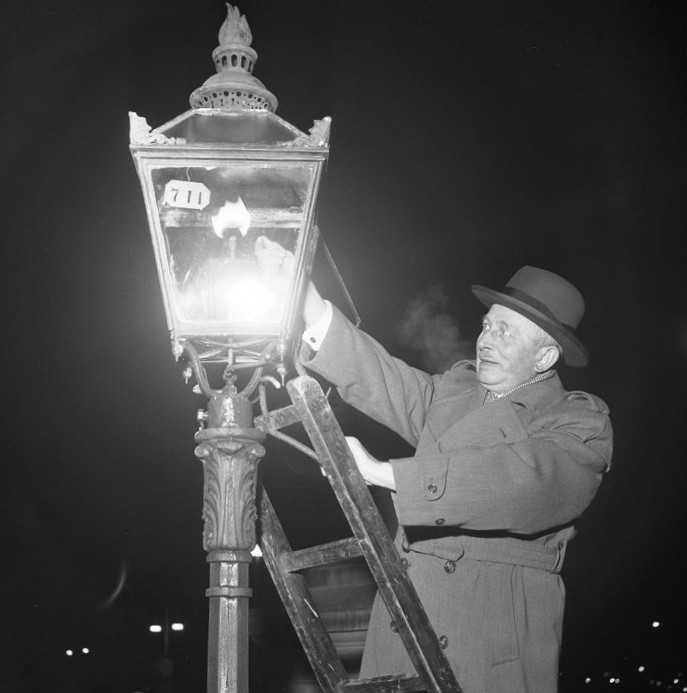
Gas

The first streetlights in Europe were suspended lanterns that housed candles or lamps. Much brighter gas lighting was developed in the 1800s.

Artificial lighting expanded the scope of acceptable work and leisure after dark. In the 1600s, the major European cities introduced streetlights. These were lit by lamplighters each evening outside of the summer months. Early streetlights were metal and glass enclosures housing candles or oil lamps. They were suspended above streets or mounted on posts. The use of artificial lighting led to an increase in acceptable nightlife. In more rural areas, night remained a period of rest and nocturnal labor. Young adults, the urban poor, prostitutes, and thieves benefited from the anonymity of darkness and frequently smashed the new lanterns. Gas lighting was invented in the 1800s. A gas mantle was over ten times brighter than an oil lamp. Gas lighting was associated with the creation of regular police forces. In England, police departments were tasked with maintaining the gas lights, which became known as "police lamps". Daytime routines were further pushed back into the night by the electric light bulb—invented in the late 19th century—and the widespread usage of newer timekeeping devices like watches. Electric lights created night shifts for traditionally daytime fields, like India's cotton industry, and created opportunities for working adults to attend night school.

=== Fear of the dark ===
The widespread usage of artificial lighting and other technologies has allowed many aspects of daily life and daytime social controls to continue after sunset. Fear of the dark and belief in creatures of the night has decreased but remains a significant part of modern life. One side effect of measures to police and promote urban nightlife is reduced personal privacy. Another side effect is the emergence of 8-hour sleep cycles replacing segmented sleep. Before the widespread usage of artificial lighting, sleep was typically split into two major segments separated by about an hour of wakefulness. During this midnight period, people engaged in prayer, crimes, urination, sex, and, most commonly, reflection. Without exposure to artificial light, studies show that people revert to sleeping in two separate intervals.

Fear of the dark and the night remains widespread and only amounts to a phobia in rare cases. Nighttime fears are especially common among children. These fears are typically mild, and most children grow out of them. About 1 in 5 children have persistent and intense fears that correlate with decreased sleep quality and anxiety for both the child and their family. Lucretius and Aristotle observed a similar fear of the dark more present among children in the classical era, and there are long traditions among various cultures of telling children bedtime stories of bogeymen and villains who prey upon disobedient children.

Among adults, walking alone after dark is a common nighttime fear. It is so common, that criminologists have used some variation of the question, "How safe do you feel or would you feel being alone in your neighbourhood after dark?" to gauge a population's fear of crime and victimization. The fear is most strongly reported by women and sexual minorities. A 1975 study found that the most common nighttime fears expressed by women were murder and sexual assault. Despite most urban crimes correlating to daytime hours of peak activity, violent crime remains most common after dark.

=== Folklore and religion ===
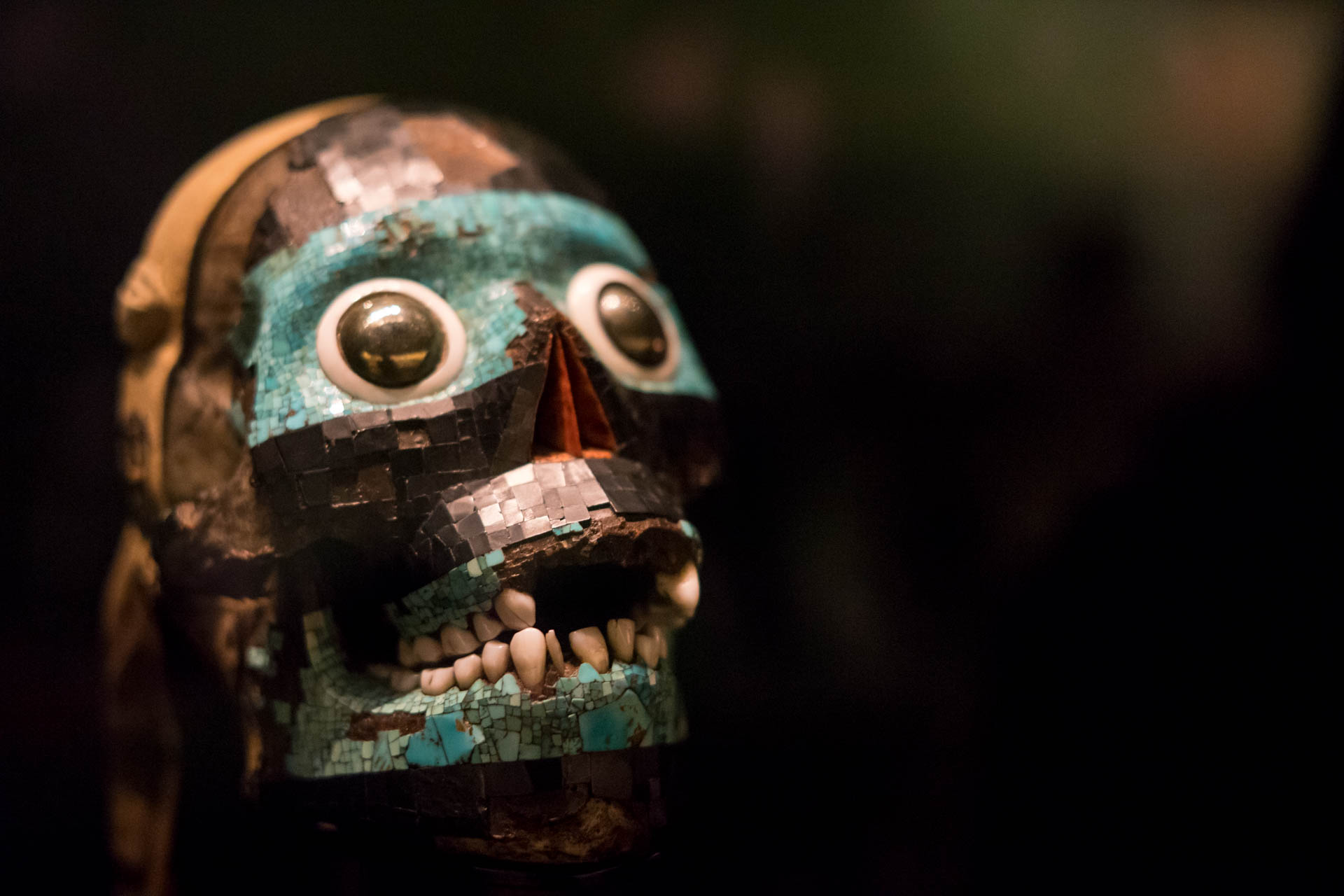
Mask of Tezcatlipoca, the Aztec "Night Wind"

Diverse cultures have made connections between the night sky and the afterlife. Many Native American peoples have described the Milky Way as a path where the deceased travel as stars. The Lakota term for the Milky Way is Wanáǧi Thacháŋku, or "Spirit's Road". In Mayan mythology, the Milky Way's dark band is the Road of Xibalba, the path to the underworld. Unrelated cultures share a myth of a star-covered sky goddess who arches over the planet after sunset, like Citlālicue, the Aztec personification of the Milky Way. The elongated Egyptian goddess Nut and N!adima from Botswana are said to consume the Sun at dusk. In the Ancient Egyptian religion, the Sun then travels through the netherworld inside Nut's body, where it is reborn at dawn.

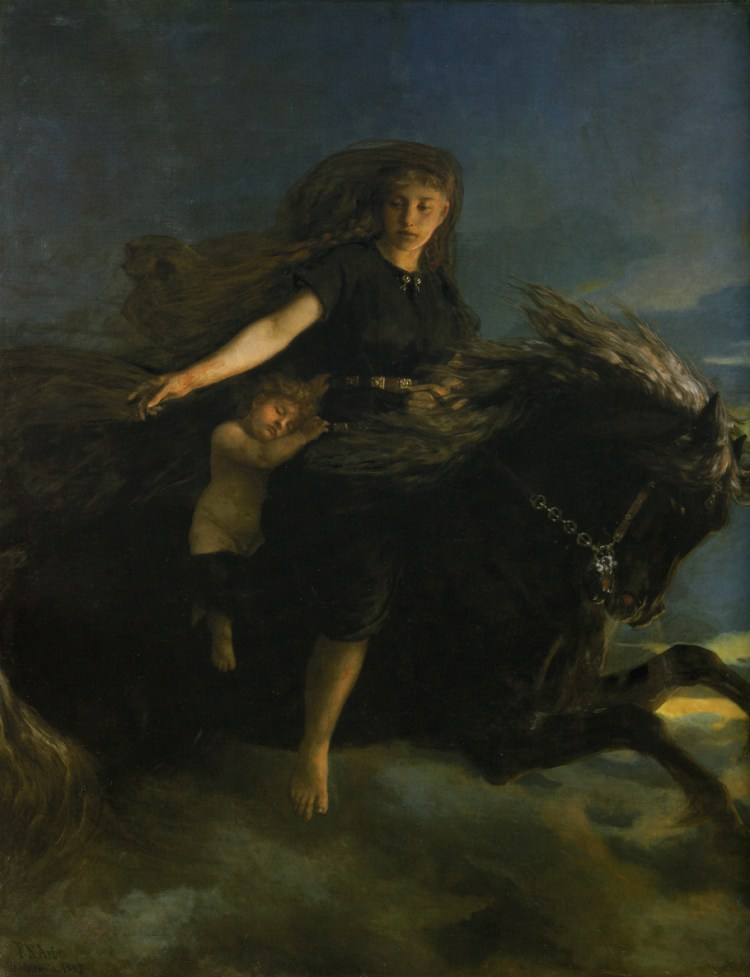
Nótt, the personification of night in Norse mythology, rides her horse in this 1887 painting by Peter Nicolai Arbo.

Many cultures have personified the night. Ratri is the star-covered Hindu goddess of the night. In the Icelandic Prose Edda, night is embodied by Nótt. Ratri and Nött are goddesses of sleep and rest, but it is common for personifications to be associated with misfortune. In Aztec mythology, Black Tezcatlipoca, the "Night Wind", was associated with obsidian and the nocturnal jaguar. In his "Precious Owl" manifestation, the Aztecs regarded Tezcatlipoca as the bringer of death and destruction. The Aztecs anticipated an unending night when the Tzitzimīmeh, skeletal female star deities, would descend to consume all humans. In classical mythology, the night goddess Nyx is the mother of Sleep, Death, Disease, Strife, and Doom. In Jewish culture and mysticism, the demon Lilith embodies the emotional reactions to darkness, including terror, lust, and liberation.

Nighttime in the pre-industrial period, often called the "night season", was associated with darkness and uncertainty. Various cultures have regarded the night as a time when ghosts and other spirits are active on Earth. When Protestant theologians abandoned the concept of purgatory, many came to view reported ghost sightings as the result of demonic activity. In the sixteenth century, Swiss theologian Ludwig Lavater began attempting to explain reported spirits as mistakes, deceit, or the work of demons. The idea of night as a dangerous, dark, or haunted time persists in modern urban legends like the vanishing hitchhiker.

Many times in the night season, there have been certain spirits heard softly going or spitting or groaning, who being asked what they were have made answer that they were the souls of this or that man and that they now endure extreme torments.

— Ludwig Lavater, Of Ghosts and Spirits Walking by Night

In folklore, nocturnal preternatural beings like goblins, fairies, werewolves, pucks, brownies, banshees, and boggarts have overlapping but non-synonymous definitions. The werewolf—and its francophone variations, the loup-garou and rougarou—were believed to be people who transformed into beasts at night. In West Africa and among the African diaspora, there is a widespread tradition of a type of vampire who removes their human skin at night and travels as a blood-sucking ball of light. Variation includes the feu-follet, the Surinamese asema, the Caribbean sukuyan, the Ashanti obayifo, and the Ghanaian asanbosam. The medieval fear of night-flying European witches was influenced by the Roman strix. The Romans described the strix as capable of changing between a beautiful woman and an owl-shaped monster. Common themes among these mythical nocturnal entities include hypersexuality, predation, shapeshifting, deception, mischief, and malice.

=== Nightlife ===
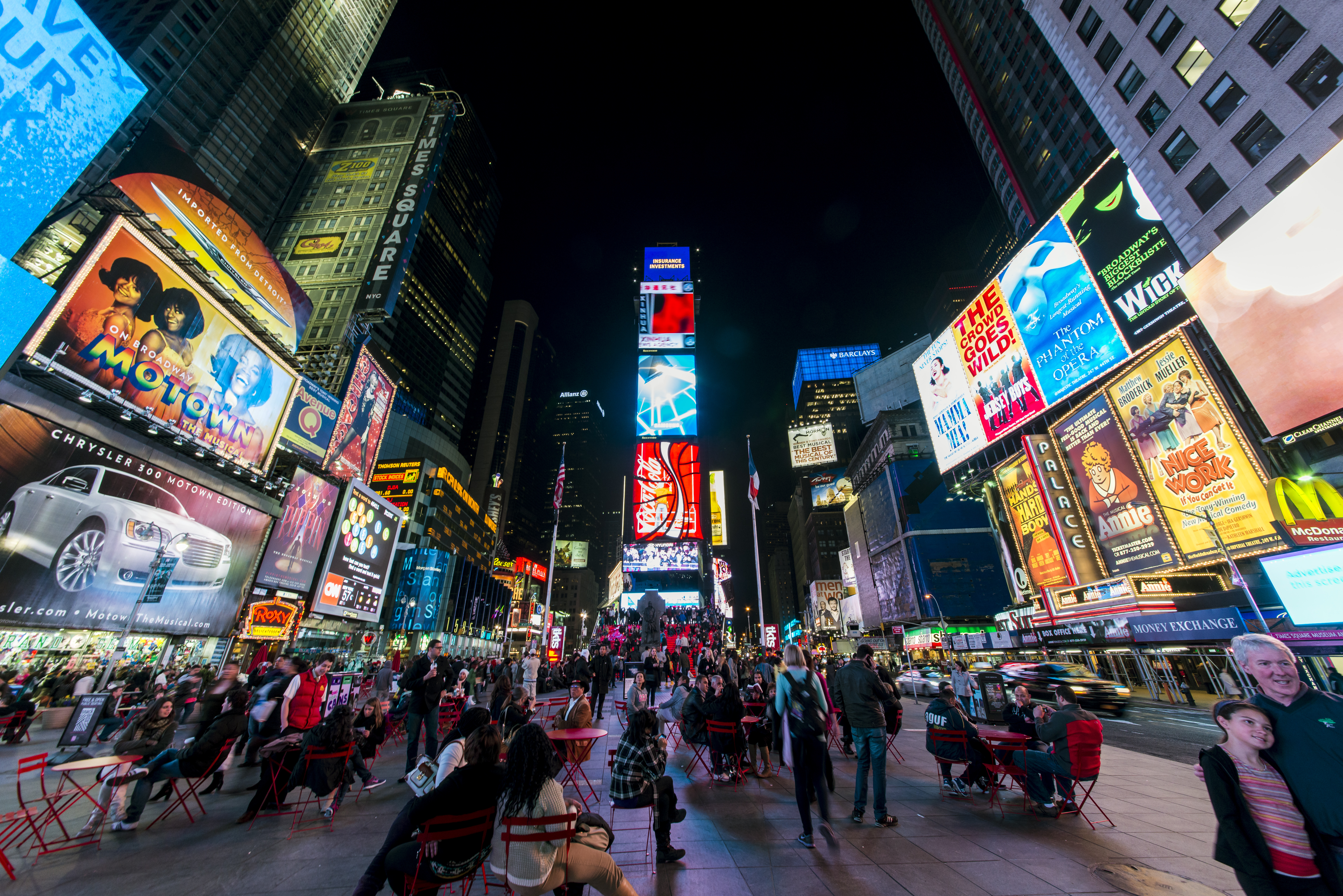
Nightlife in Times Square, Midtown Manhattan

Nightlife, sometimes referred to as "the night-time economy", is a range of entertainment available and generally more popular from the late evening into the early morning. It has traditionally included venues such as pubs, bars, nightclubs, live music, concerts, cabarets, theaters, hookah lounges, cinemas, and shows. Nightlife entertainment is often more adult-oriented than daytime entertainment. It also includes informal gatherings like parties, botellón, gymkhanas, bingo, and amateur sports. In many cities, there has been an increasing focus on nightlife catering to tourists. Nightlife has become a major part of the economy and urban planning in modern cities. People who prefer to be active at night are called night owls.

Social movements in the 20th century, including feminism, black activism, the gay rights movement, and community action, blurred the lines between political action and broader cultural activities, making political movements a part of the nightlife. Sociologists have argued that vibrant city nightlife scenes contribute to the development of culture and political movements. David Grazian cites as examples the development of beat poetry, musical styles including bebop, urban blues, and early rock, and the importance of nightlife for the development of the gay rights movement in the United States kicked off by the riots at the Stonewall Inn nightclub in Greenwich Village, Lower Manhattan, New York City. Modern cities treat nightlife as necessary to the city's marketability but also something to be managed in order to reduce activities viewed as disorderly, risky, or otherwise problematic. Urban renewal policies have increased the available possibilities for nighttime consumers and decreased non-commercial nocturnal activities outside of sanctioned festivals and concerts.

== Art ==
=== Literature ===
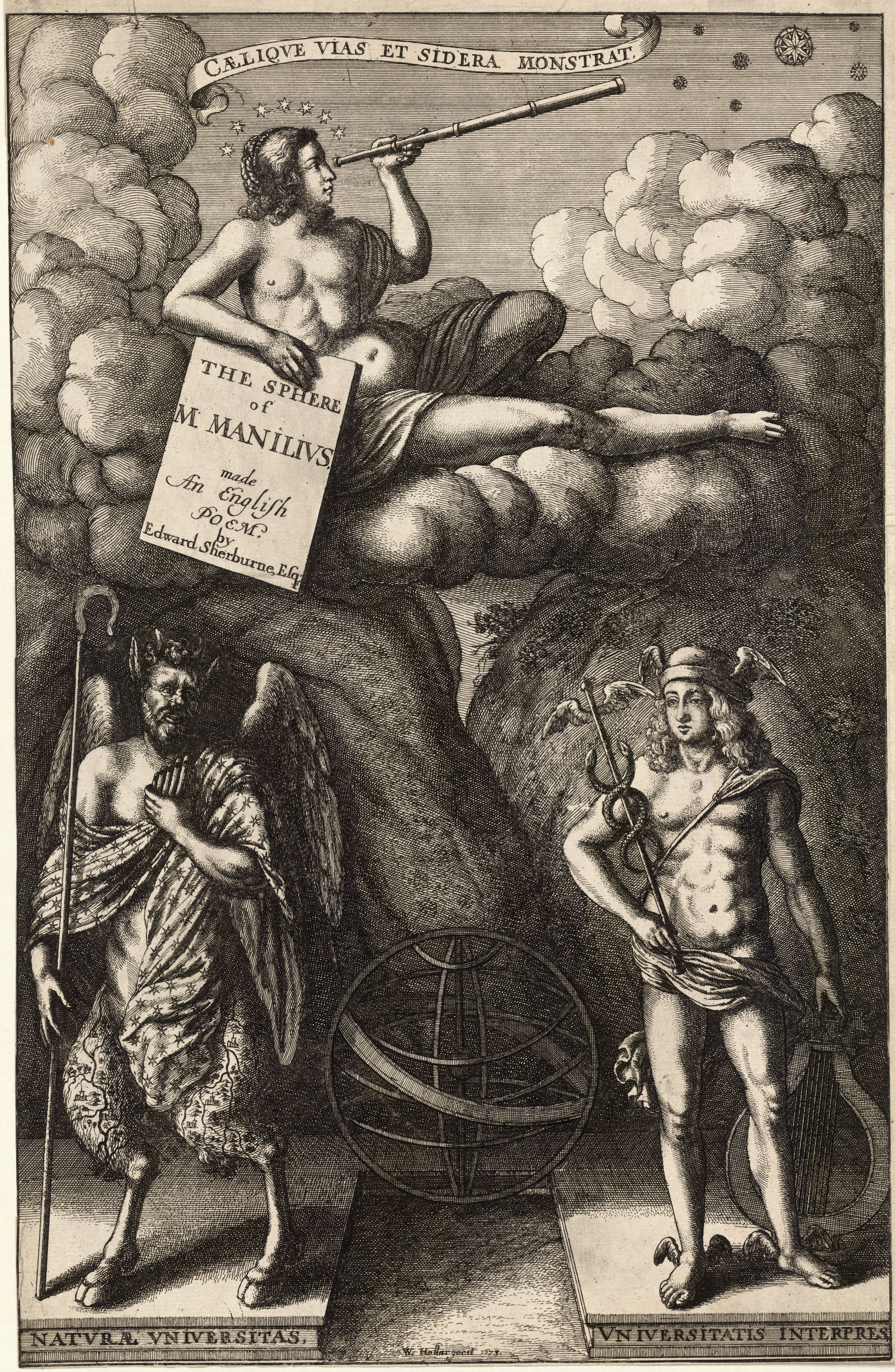
The Sphere by Marcus Manilius, translated into English by Edward Sherburne in the 17th century

In literature, night is often associated with mysterious, hidden, dangerous, and clandestine activities. Rhesus is the only extant Greek tragedy where night is explicitly invoked and made an element of the story. In the play, night is a time of disorder and confusion that allows Odysseus to sneak into the Trojan camp and kill King Rhesus of Thrace. The handful of surviving Classical Greek texts that describe the nocturnal activities of women portray female freedom, especially to speak openly, male anxieties about that freedom, and magic that functions as a metaphor for nocturnal danger. Roman poets like Marcus Manilius and Aratus worked late into the night and incorporated darkness and the night sky into their writing.

Since the Age of Enlightenment, nocturnal settings have been a frequent place for passionate chaos as a counterbalance to the rationality present during the day. In Gothic fiction, this absence of rationality offered a space for lust and terror. Ottoman literature portrayed night as a time for forbidden or unrequited love. Night and day were long depicted as opposite conditions. The electric light, the industrial revolution, and shift work brought many aspects of daily life into the night. The author Charles Dickens lived in London during the time of gas lighting and compared the unstable separation between the waking and sleeping city to the unstable separation he perceived between dream and delusion. Night in contemporary literature offers liminal settings, such as hospitals and gas stations, that contain some aspects of daily life.

Night fell, while Helga Crane in the rushing swiftness of a roaring elevated train sat numb. It was as if all the bogies and goblins that had beset her unloved, unloving, and unhappy childhood had come to life with tenfold power to hurt and frighten.

— Nella Larsen, Quicksand

=== Film and photography ===
A night scene tinted blue from the 1925 film The Phantom of the Opera

Directly filming at night is rarely done. Film stocks and video cameras are much less sensitive in low-light environments than the human eye. During the silent film era, many night scenes were filmed during the day in black and white. Sections of the monochrome film reel with exterior night scenes were soaked in an acidic dye that tinted the whole scene blue. "Day for night" is a set of cinematic techniques that simulate a night scene while filming in daylight. They include underexposing to soften the scene, using a graduated neutral-density filter to mute lighting, and setting up the artificial lighting to amplify shadows in the background. Lower-budget films are more likely to use day for night shooting; larger-budget films are more likely to film at night with artificial lighting. Cinematographers have used tinting, filters, color balance settings, and physical lights to color night scenes blue. In low light, people experience the Purkinje effect, which causes reds to dim so that more blue is perceived. As light decreases towards total darkness, the human eye has more scotopic vision, relying more on rod cells and being less able to perceive color.

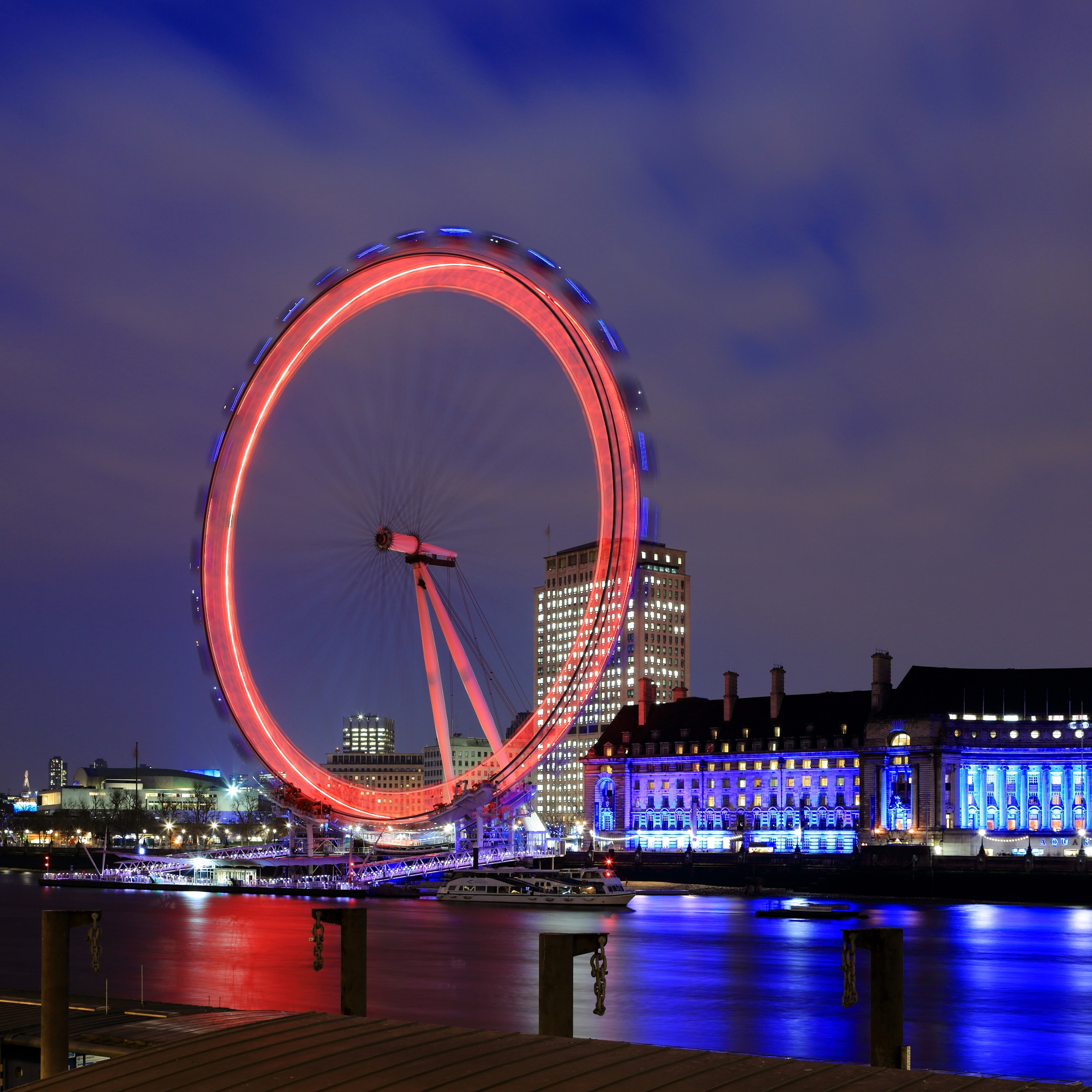
A long-exposure photograph of the London Eye at night

Night photography can capture the natural colors of night by increasing the exposure time, or length of time captured in the photography. Longer exposures open the possibility for photographers to use light painting to selectively illuminate a scene. Digital photography can also make use of high-ISO settings, which increase the sensitivity to light, to take shorter exposure shots. This makes it possible to capture moving subjects without turning their movements into a blur.

=== Painting ===
Dating back to prehistoric cave paintings, artists have used a range of symbols to denote and depict the night sky. The first widely accepted portrayal of the night sky is the Nebra sky disc created c. 1600 BC. In medieval art, astrological signs gave meaning to paintings of night scenes. Adam Elsheimer's paintings on copper plates were some of the earliest realistic depictions of the night sky.

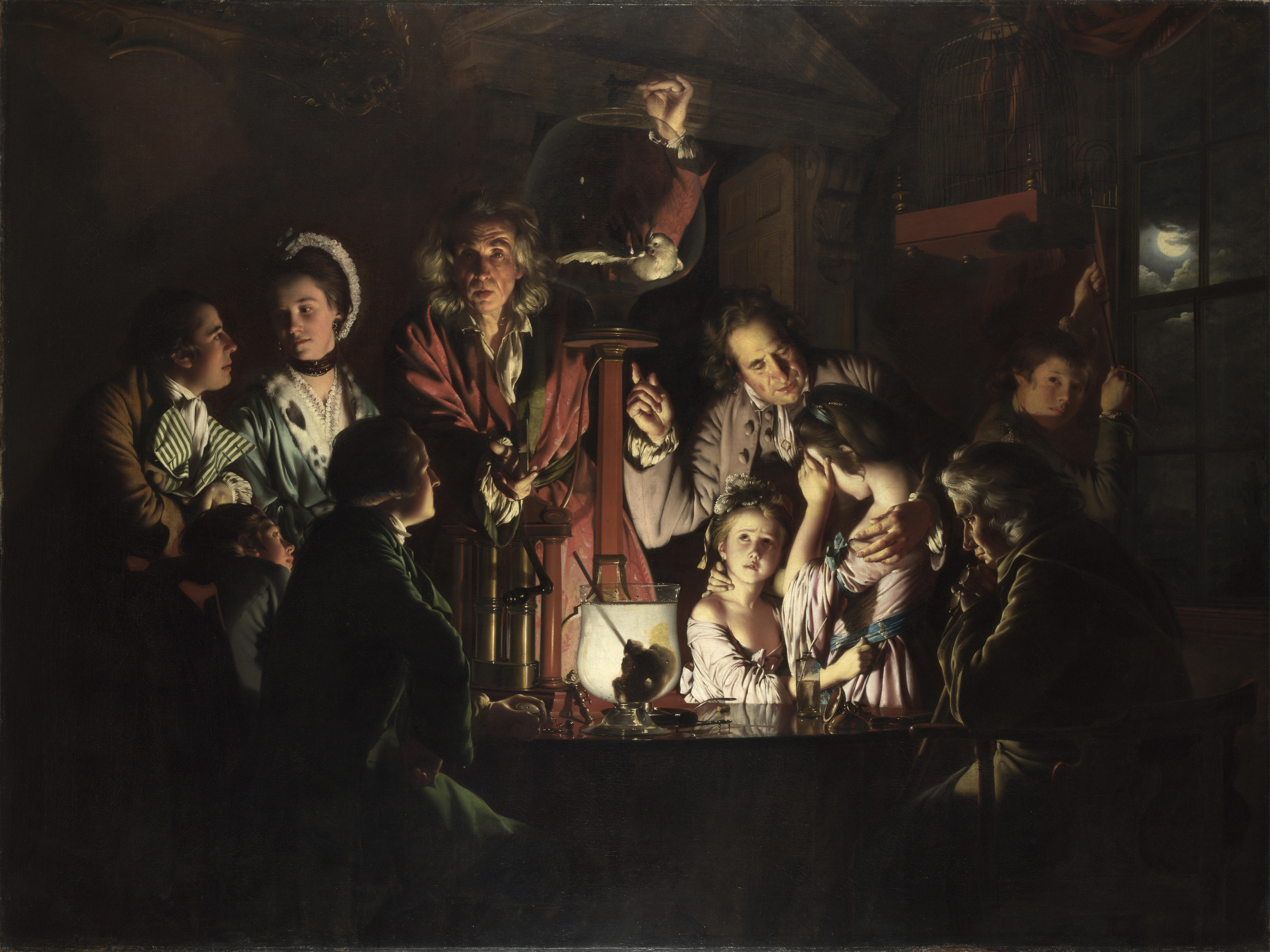
An Experiment on a Bird in the Air Pump (1768), by Joseph Wright of Derby

Baroque paintings typically used a darker color scheme than previous painting styles in Europe. From the 17th century, darkness took up larger areas of paintings on average. Changes in the chemical composition of the paint itself and the development of new techniques for representing light led to the tenebrism style of painting. Tenebrism used stark, realistic depictions of light contrasted with darkness to create realistic depictions of night and darkness illuminated by moonlight, candles, and lamps. The work of Baroque painters, like Caravaggio, who painted an entire studio black, was influenced by the alchemical concept of "nigredo", or blackness as connected to death and decomposition. Dutch Golden Age painter Rembrandt recreated the dim light cast by early street lighting by layering translucent brown glazes.

The Starry Night (1889), by Van Gogh

Impressionists represented darkness with shades of brown and blue based on the ideas that true black was not present in nature and that black had a deadening effect on the art. Claude Monet notably avoided black paints. Vincent van Gogh used heavy outlines between panes of color in his paintings, inspired by woodblock printing in Japan. This style, called cloisonné after the metalworking technique that embedded glass between dark lines of wire, was adopted by other painters like Paul Gauguin. As night in Europe became more artificially lit, former railway worker John Atkinson Grimshaw became known for his vibrantly lit urban paintings. In the modern era, painters have variously returned to archetypal symbols to capture the awe of night or painted scenes that emphasize how the modern city separates the viewer from the night sky.

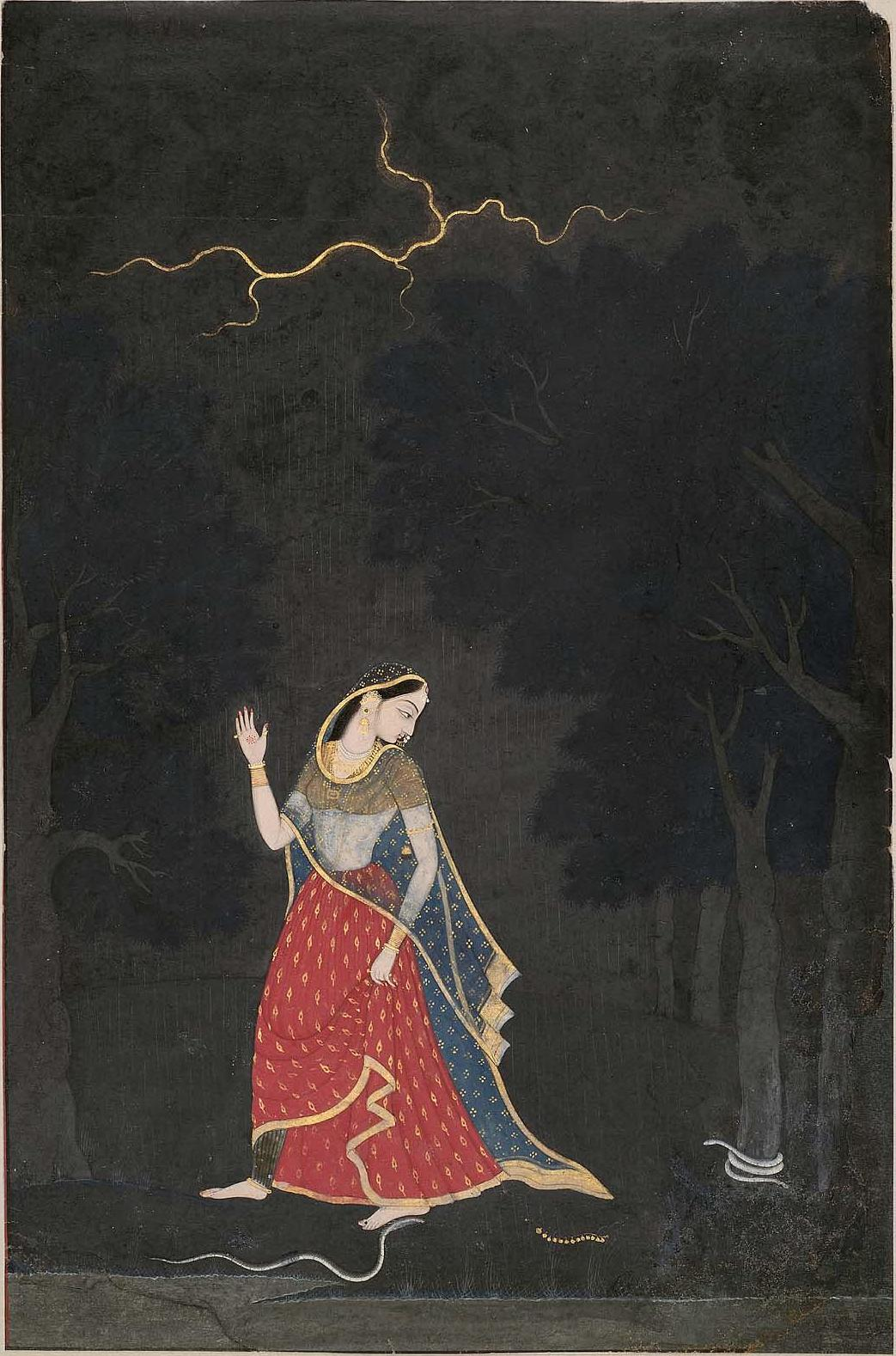
Abhisarika Nayika (c. 1800), by Mola Ram

Near Eastern artists initially rejected these techniques to depict shadow as hiding aspects of creation in shadows. Mughal painters quickly incorporated techniques to depict night, twilight, and mists. Under Emperor Akbar I, European materials and techniques were imported. Rajasthani paintings combined these with traditional styles and symbolism. Nayikas, depictions of women seeking romantic love, were a common subject and often included night as the setting for romance and peril. Jesuit painter Giuseppe Castiglione brought Renaissance techniques for painting light and shadow to 17th-century China. In pieces like One Hundred Famous Views of Edo, Hiroshige developed techniques to represent shadow and nocturnal light that became widespread in Japanese Meiji-era art. Known for his crowd scenes lit by fireworks, Hiroshige had a strong influence on European painters.

== See also ==
- Earth's shadow
- Night aviation regulations in the United States
- Nocturne
- Olbers's paradox
