= Naglfari =

Being in Nordic mythology

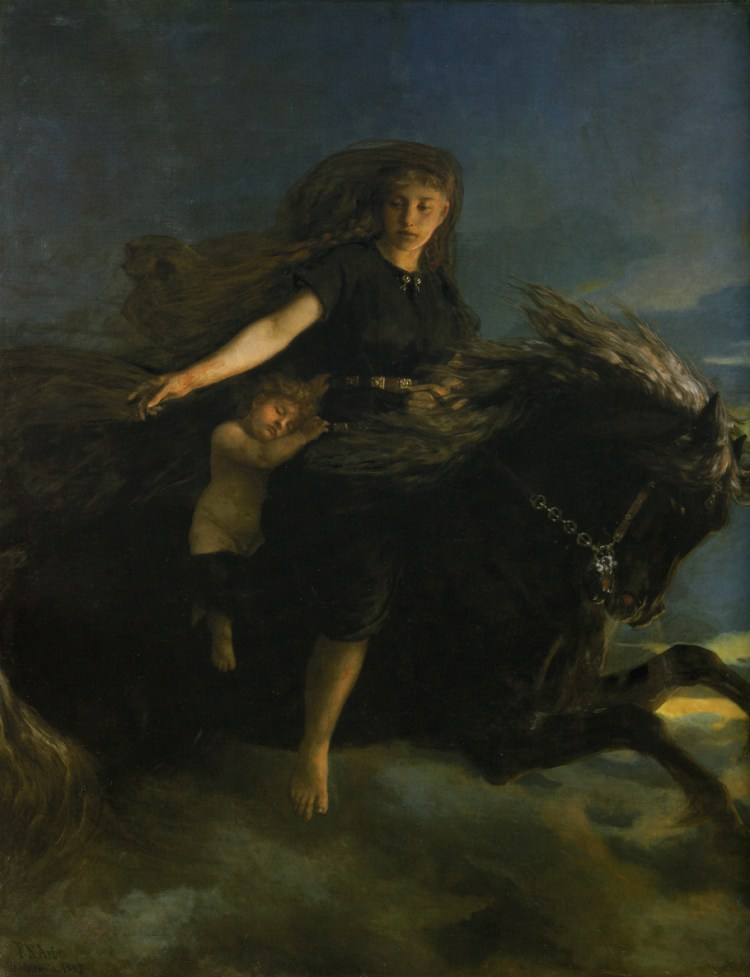
“Natten” (“The Night”) by Peter Nicolai Arbo, depicting Nótt with her child, Auðr, son of Naglfari

In Nordic mythology, Naglfari is the father of Auðr by the personified night, Nótt. Naglfari is attested in a single mention in the Prose Edda (written in the 13th century by Snorri Sturluson) book Gylfaginning, where he is described as one of a series of three husbands of Nótt, and that the couple produced a son, Auðr. No additional information is provided about Naglfari.

Rudolf Simek theorizes that Snorri invented Naglfari but states that his reason for doing so is unknown.
