= Jörð =

Earth-goddess in Norse mythology

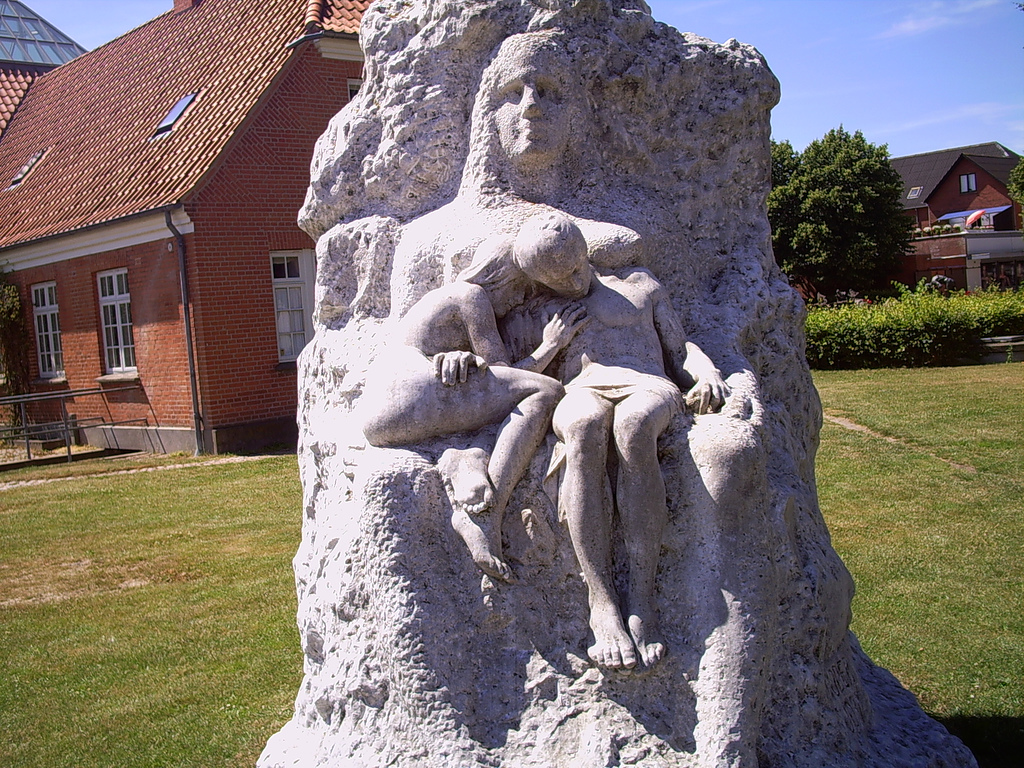
Moder Jord (Mother Earth) by Stephan Sinding

Jörð (Old Norse: Jǫrð, lit. 'earth'), also named Fjörgyn or Hlödyn, is the personification of Earth and a goddess in Norse mythology. She is the mother of the thunder god Thor and a sexual partner of Odin. Jörð is attested in Danish history Gesta Danorum, composed in the 12th century by Danish historian Saxo Grammaticus; the Poetic Edda, compiled in the 13th century by an unknown individual or individuals; and the Prose Edda, also composed in the 13th century. Her name is often employed in skaldic poetry and kennings as a poetic term for land or Earth.

== Name ==
=== Etymology ===
Old Norse jǫrð means 'earth, land', serving both as a common noun ('earth') and as a theonymic incarnation of the noun ('Earth-goddess'). It stems from Proto-Germanic *erþō- ('earth, soil, land'), as evidenced by the Gothic airþa, Old English eorþ, Old Saxon ertha, or Old High German (OHG) erda. The Ancient Greek word éra (ἔρα; 'earth') is also possibly related. The word is most likely cognate with Proto-Germanic *erwa or erwōn-, meaning 'sand, soil' (cf. Old Norse jǫrfi 'sand, gravel', OHG ero 'earth').

=== Alternative names ===
Fjörgyn is considered by scholars to be another name for Jörð. She is similarly described as Thor's mother and her name is also used as a poetic synonym for 'land' or 'the earth' in skaldic poems. The name Hlóðyn, mentioned in Völuspá (50) (as "son of Hlódyn" for Thor), is most likely also used as a synonym for Jörð. The etymology of Hlóðyn remains unclear, although it is often thought to be related to the goddess Hludana, to whom Romano-Germanic votive tablets have been found on the Lower Rhine.

== Attestations ==
=== Gesta Danorum ===
Jörð receives mention in Danish historian Saxo Grammaticus's Gesta Danorum as Iuritha.

=== Poetic Edda ===
In the Poetic Edda, Jörð receives mention in the poems Völuspá and Lokasenna. In Völuspá, Thor is referred to as mǫgr Hlóðyniar and Fjǫrgyniar burr (child of Hlóðyn, Fjörgyn's child). Hlóðyn, although etymologically unclear, must therefore have been another name of Jörð.

In Lokasenna, Thor is called Jarðar burr ("son of Jörð").

=== Prose Edda ===
Jörð is attested in the Prose Edda books Gylfaginning and Skáldskaparmál. According to section 10 of Gylfaginning: Additionally, the section describes Jörð's ancestry as follows (the included note is Faulkes's own; Faulkes uses the anglicization Iord throughout his edition of the Prose Edda):

Norfi or Narfi was the name of a giant who lived in Giantland. He had a daughter called Night. She was black and dark in accordance with her ancestry. She was married to a person called Naglfari. Their son was called Aud. Next she was married to someone called Annar. Their daughter was called Iord [Earth].

This section, however, varies by manuscript (see discussion below).

Section 25 of Gylfaginning lists Jörð among the ásynjur (Old Norse 'goddesses', singular ásynja):

Thor's mother Iord and Vali's mother Rind are reckoned among the Asyniur.

Skáldskaparmál mentions Jörð numerous times, including in several quotes from skaldic poetry. The second section 4 of the book list kennings for the god Thor, including "son of Odin and Iord". Section 17 quotes Þjóðólfr of Hvinir's composition Haustlöng, in which the skald refers to Thor as "the son of Iord" twice. The poem is quoted again in section 23. Section 18 quotes Eilífr Goðrúnarson's composition Þórsdrápa, in which the skald refers to Thor as "Iord's son".

Section 19 contains a list of kennings for the goddess Frigg, including "rival of Iord and Rind and Gunnlod and Gerd". Section 90 contains a list of kennings for Jörð, referencing a variety of skaldic kennings for the goddess:

How shall earth be referred to? By calling it Ymir's flesh and mother of Thor, daughter of Onar, bride of Odin, rival of Frigg and Rind and Gunnlod, mother-in-law of Sif, floor and base of winds' hall, sea of the animals, daughter of Night, sister of Aud and Day.

The section contains quotes from poems by Hallfreðr vandræðaskáld and Þjóðólfr of Hvinir. The Nafnaþulur section of Skáldskaparmál includes Jörð in a list of ásynjur names.

Additionally, as the common noun jörð also simply means 'Earth', references to Earth occur throughout the Prose Edda.

== Scholarly reception ==
According to philologist Rudolf Simek, Jörð is "[a]n Æsir goddess, even though she is also called a giantess". Simek highlights parallels between Thor and the Vedic deity Indra: "Just as Thor's counterpart in Indian mythology, Indra, is begotten by the god of the heavens Dyaus and the Earth, so Thor is also the son of the Earth, just like the proto-ancestor Tuisto ... ".

According to folklorist John Lindow, "Jörd must have been a giantess in the beginning. If so, Odin’s marriage (or, more likely, sexual relationship outside marriage, perhaps not even a willing one on her part) to Jörd should be regarded as parallel to his other strategically minded relationships with giantesses."

Philologist Haukur Thorgeirsson points out that the four manuscripts of Gylfaginning vary in their descriptions of the family relations between Nótt, Jörð, Dagr, and Dellingr. Depending on the manuscript, either Jörð or Nótt is the mother of Dagr and partner of Dellingr. Haukur details that "the oldest manuscript, U, offers a version where Jǫrð is the wife of Dellingr and the mother of Dagr while the other manuscripts, R, W and T, cast Nótt in the role of Dellingr's wife and Dagr's mother", and argues that "the version in U came about accidentally when the writer of U or its antecedent shortened a text similar to that in RWT. The results of this accident made their way into the Icelandic poetic tradition".

Some 19th-century scholars proposed that Thor's brother Meili should be understood as the son of Jörð.

== See also ==
- Æcerbot, an Old English charm and ritual invoking the personified Earth
- Mat Zemlya, the Slavic 'Mother Earth'
