= Hrafnagaldr Óðins =

Icelandic poem

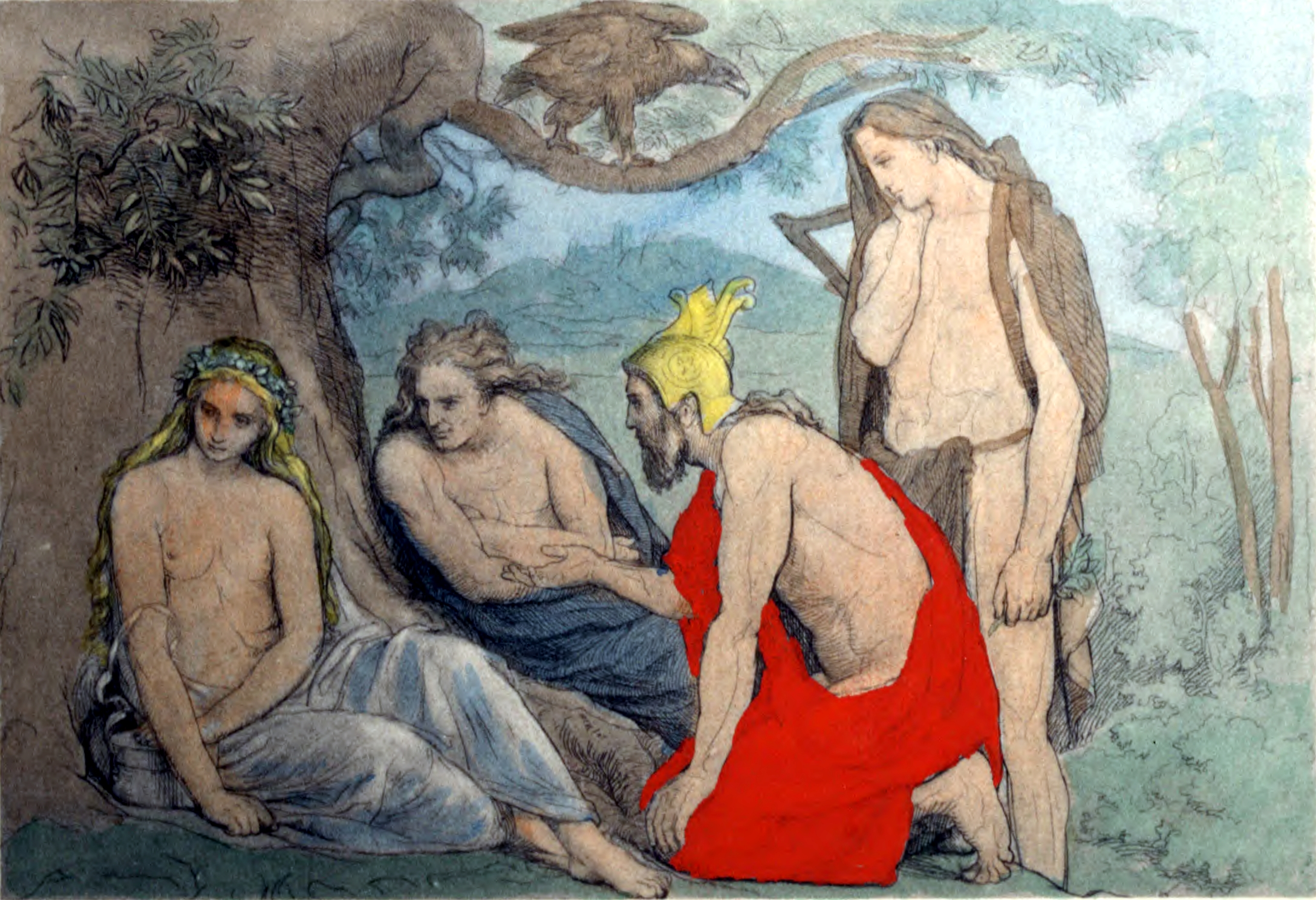
The storyline of Hrafnagaldr Óðins involves the goddess Iðunn and the gods Loki, Heimdallr and Bragi. Illustration by Lorenz Frølich.

Hrafnagaldr Óðins ('Odin's raven-galdr') or Forspjallsljóð ('prelude poem') is an Icelandic poem in the style of the Poetic Edda. It is preserved only in late paper manuscripts. In his influential 1867 edition of the Poetic Edda, Sophus Bugge reasoned that the poem was a 17th-century work, composed as an introduction to Baldrs draumar. Since then it has not been included in editions of the Poetic Edda and not been extensively studied. But prior to Bugge's work the poem was considered a part of the Poetic Edda and included, for example, in the English translations of A. S. Cottle (1797) and Benjamin Thorpe (1866) as well as Karl Simrock's influential German translation (1851). In 1852, William and Mary Howitt characterized it as "amongst the most deeply poetical and singular hymns of the Edda".

== Date ==
In 2002, Jónas Kristjánsson in the Icelandic daily Morgunblaðið argued in favor of an earlier dating than Bugge, perhaps to the 14th century, based on linguistic evidence and the seemingly corrupt state of the text.

However, metrical, linguistic, and stylistic evidence all point towards a date in the 16th century at the earliest, and the scholarly consensus has rested on the seventeenth. (Note: Haukur Þorgeirsson (2010), p. 315, "has recently dated to the first half of the 17th century", quoted from Aðalheiður Guðmundsdóttir (May 2013). "The Tradition of Icelandic sagnakvæði" (PDF). RMN Newsletter (6): 19n4. Archived from the original (PDF) on 2015-09-24.) Annette Lassen, in her preliminary assessment (2006) had stated conservatively that this poem should not be subject to greater skepticism than e.g. Fjölsvinnsmál and Sólarljóð (other Eddic poems thought to be of later authorship and exist only in paper manuscripts). But in her 2011 critical edition with accompanying translation (rendered into English by Anthony Faulkes), she states unequivocally that the poem "is a postmedieval poem" probably composed soon after "the rediscovery of the Codex Regius of the Elder Edda in 1643". Elsewhere she assigns a terminus post quem to when the Icelanders were familiarized with Erasmus's Adagia (1500), which she says must have been the conduit through which the poet learned the adage in nocte consilium which is adapted into the poem in st. 22. Another dating clue is the occurrence of the word máltíd st. 20, a Middle Low German loanword, used in Iceland after the middle of the 14th century, though the poem can "hardly be as old as that."

== Contents ==
The poem consists of 26 fornyrðislag eight-line stanzas. It involves several known figures from Norse mythology, including Odin, Iðunn, Heimdallr, Loki and Bragi, but does not appear to describe a myth known from other sources.

The poem begins with five stanzas of ominous introduction, the narrative proper setting in during stanza 6. Idunn falls from the world-tree (stanzas 6-7) and is given a wolfskin to wear (stanza 8). Alarmed, Odin sends a trio of messengers led by Heimdall to get news from a woman designated as "the doorpost of Gjöll's sun" (Giallar sunnu gátt, a kenning for woman) (stanza 9). The identity of the woman that Heimdall and his companions visit in the lower world is not revealed. She has been variously identified as Idunn, Hela, and as Urd. The messengers ask her the beginning, duration and end of heaven, the world, and hel (stanza 11). Tears are her only response (stanzas 12-13). The failed messengers return to Asgard, joining a feast in progress (stanzas 14-15). Heimdall tells the gods of their mission; Loki informs the goddesses (stanzas 16-19). The festivities conclude (stanza 21), and the onset of night is described in mythological terms (stanzas 22-26). In the final verse, Heimdall lifts his horn toward heaven.

== Manuscript tradition ==
Hrafnagaldur Óðins is transmitted in a single version, with minimal discrepancies, contained in at least thirty-seven copies dating from the latter half of the 17th century to the 1870s, now housed in Iceland, Denmark, Sweden, Great Britain, Germany and the United States. Annette Lassen used five manuscripts of critical value in her edition. All manuscripts that contain the poem include the subtitle Forspjallsljóð.

- A - Stockholm papp. 8vo nr 15

National Library of Sweden ca. 1650-1699.

First brought to Sweden in 1681 by Guðmunður Ólafsson. Base manuscript used by Jónas Kristjánsson’s text in the newspaper Morgunblaðið (2002), and Lassen's own base text.

- B - Lbs 1562 4to

National Library of Iceland ca. 1650-1799?. (Note: 1650-1799? is the dating at handrit.is database.) A portion was written ca. 1673-7 by Ásgeir Jónsson, and the rest written in the 18th century, 8~9 scribes in all, according to Lassen, correcting Páll Eggert Ólason’s catalogue date of 1660.

- C - Stockholm papp. fol. nr 57

National Library of Sweden. ca. 1650-1699

- D - Thott 1491 4to

Royal Library, Denmark 18th century. The first leaf bears inscription "Skrifud af Diakna Paule", identified by Lassen as Deacon Páll Sveinsson Torfasonar 1704–1784 (Note: Jón Eiríksson's Codex Ericianus or Codex E employed in the Arnamagnæan also refers to the deacon's manuscript by initial "P.S." and uses variant readings from it.)

- E - Lbs 1441 4to

National Library of Iceland ca. 1760

Most other manuscripts of Hrafnagaldur Óðins are derived from A and B. The number and ordering of stanzas is the same in all manuscripts. There are only minor differences in the texts. The text of the poem is cryptic and most probably corrupt. The final stanza does not appear to form a satisfactory conclusion, suggesting that the poem as it has come down to us is incomplete.

According to analysis of the best manuscripts, the various copies all derive from a single archetype. Since it is not transmitted in other than paper manuscripts, the poem is often considered a later work, possibly a post-medieval imitation of an Eddic poem, akin to Gunnarslagr (or Gunnars-slagr), composed by Gunnar Pálsson (1714-1791). Nevertheless, a vellum manuscript of the poem may once have existed. Árni Magnússon makes reference to the poem in a letter dated June 18, 1729 to Jón Halldórsson, Dean of Hítardalur, raising the possibility that such a manuscript was lost in the Great Fire in Copenhagen of 1728, which destroyed a large part of Arni's library, including as many as 15 bound manuscripts of Eddic poetry. Bugge (who concluded the poem was of late authorship) knew the letter but dismissed it as unreliable.

== Publication history ==
The first printed edition of the poem appeared in the so-called Arnamagnæan edition of Edda Sæmundar hinns fróði (1787). The tome was a collaboration of several co-editors, but Lassen identifies Guđmundur Magnusson (Gudmundus Magnæus, 1741-1798) as the poem's editor, translator (into Latin), and commentator. The text is that of MS Icel. 47, a manuscript edition made by Jón Eiríksson, which contained variant readings, used in the critical apparatus of the edition. The critical apparatus also made use of commentary by aforementioned Gunnar Pálsson, scribbled on the manuscript AM 424 fol.

The poem was published next in Edda Sæmundar hinns fróða, 1818, edited by Rasmus Rask and Arvid August Afzelius. Hallgrimur Scheving (1837), P.A. Munch (1847), Hermann Lüning (1859), Theodor Möbius (1860), and Frederich Wilhelm Bergmann (1875) also published editions of the poem. Finnur Magnusson (1822), Karl Simrock (1851) and Benjamin Thorpe (1865) produced translations into Danish, German and English respectively.

Sophus Bugge in his 1867 edition of the Poetic Edda argued that the poem was a work of the 17th century, and after this, it was mostly ignored by editors and students of the Edda. An exception is Viktor Rydberg, who in 1886 accepted the poem as authentic and sought to explain its narrative as referring to the time Idun was taken from Asgard by Thjazi.

== Reception ==
Interest in the poem has been renewed after 1998, when Eysteinn Björnsson and William P. Reaves posted an edition of the poem with English translation and commentary online. Although this edition was "for the most part removed again in 2002", leaving only the English translation of the poem in its place, Eysteinn Björnsson and Reaves' work on the poem led to the performance of the choral and orchestral work Odin's Raven Magic with music by Sigur Rós, Hilmar Örn Hilmarsson, and Steindór Andersen. In support of this, their translation was printed in the programme of the London performance of the work at the Barbican Centre in 2002. This popular interest in the poem was followed by an Icelandic edition, edited by Icelandic philologist Jónas Kristjansson, former head of the Arni Magnusson Institute, published in the Lesbók of the Icelandic newspaper Morgunblaðid, 27/4 2002 in which he acknowledges the recent popular works.
