= List of reflected light sources =

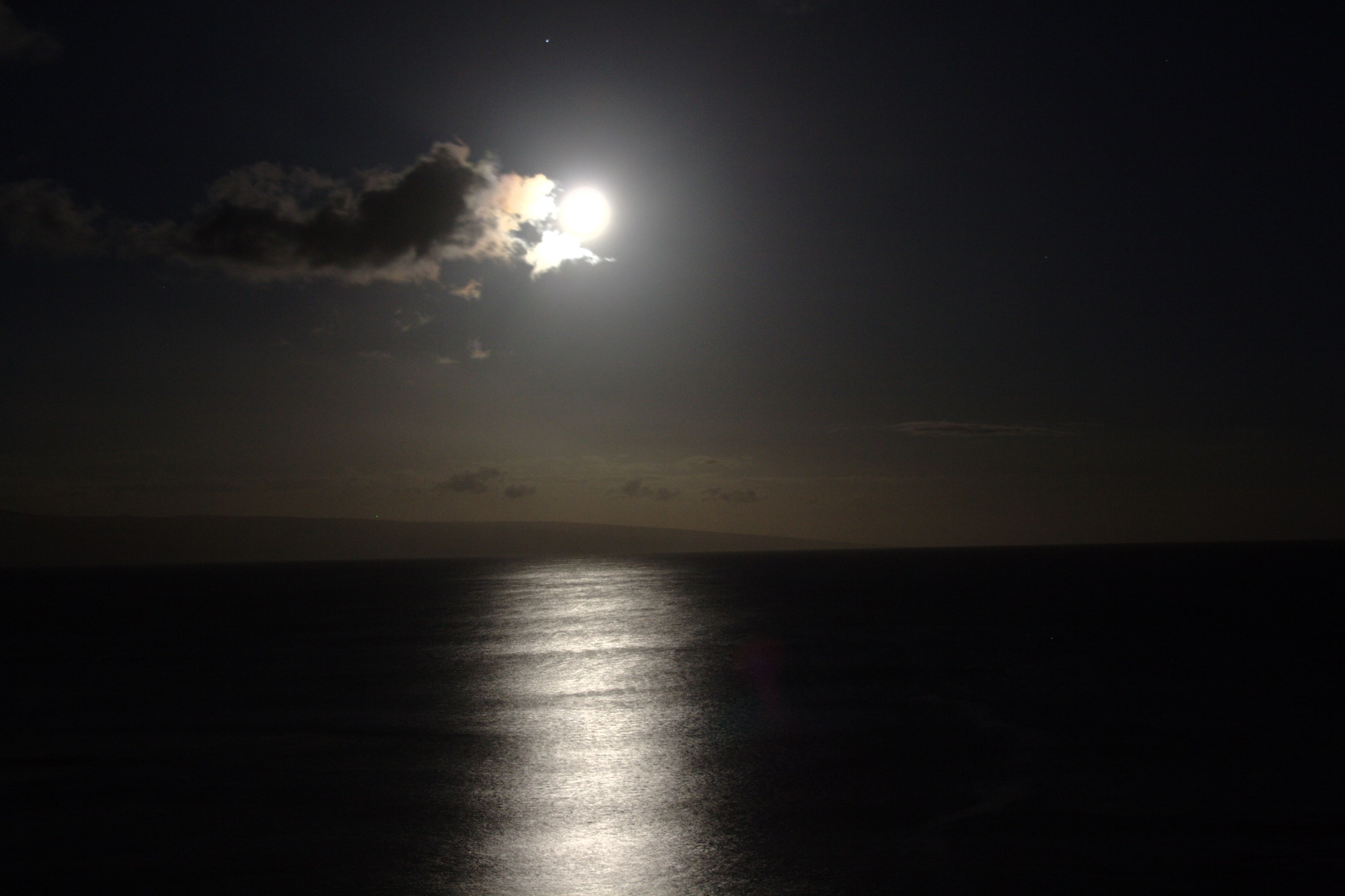
The Moon

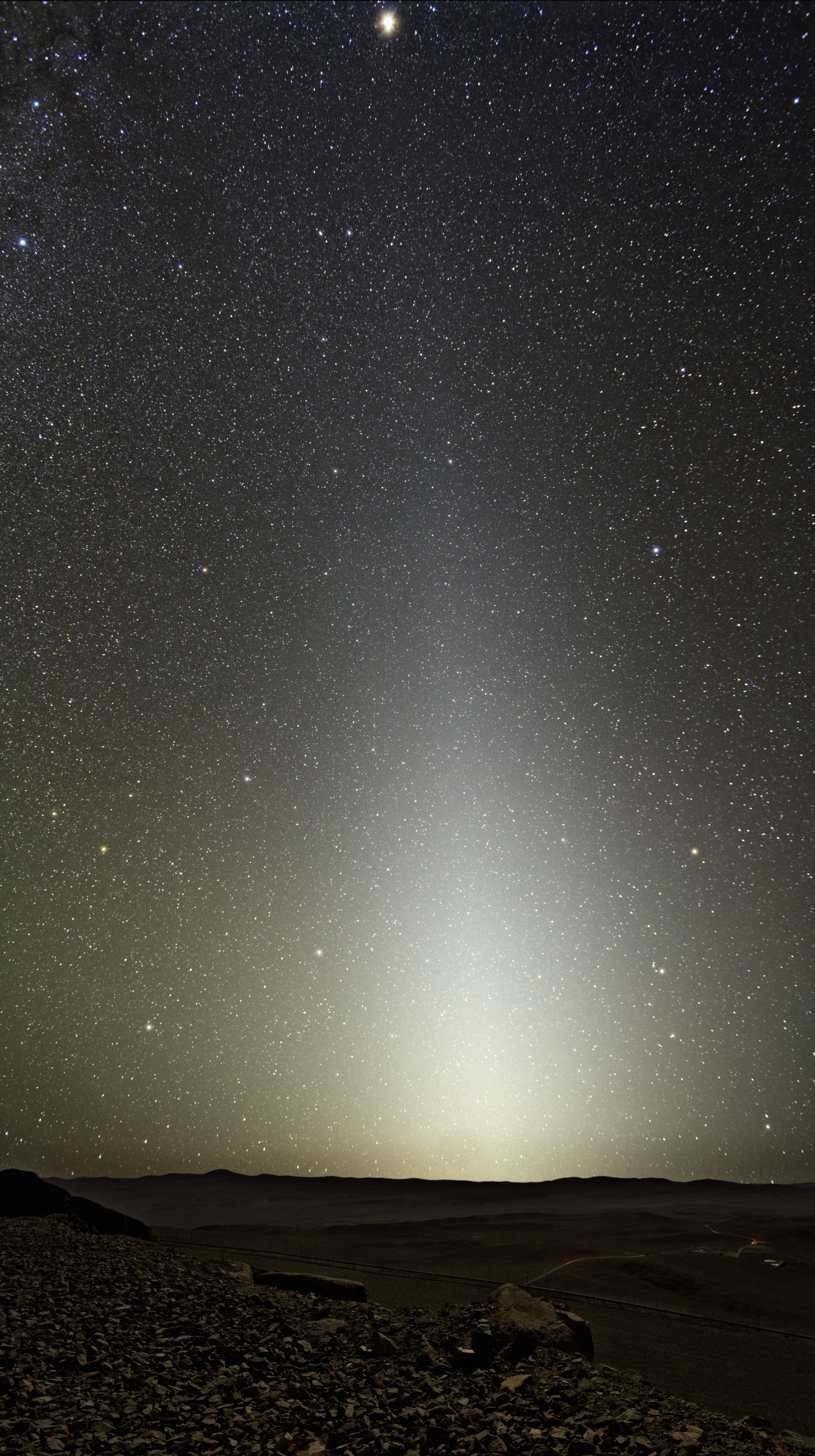
Zodiacal light

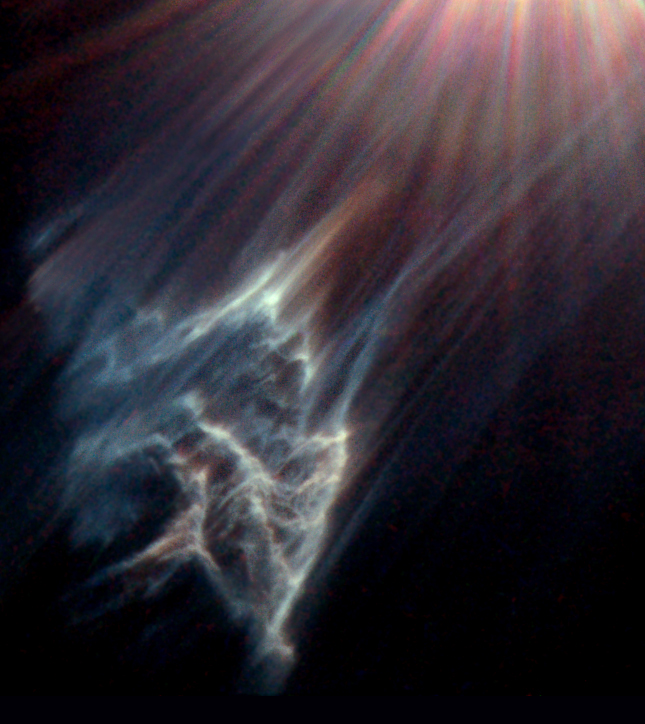
Reflection nebula

This is a list of reflected sources of light examples in contrast to the List of light sources. The list is oriented towards visible light reflection.

== Celestial and atmospheric light ==
- Moonlight – Light that reaches Earth from the Moon
- Planetshine – Illumination by reflected sunlight from a planet
  - Earthshine – Light reflected from the Earth
- Zodiacal light – Faint solar glow caused by interplanetary dust at sunset and sunrise
- Gegenschein – Optical effect of interplanetary dust reflections
- Reflection nebula – Clouds of interstellar dust which reflect the light of nearby stars
- Rainbow – Meteorological phenomenon
- Fog bow – Type of rainbow formed by fog droplets

== See also ==
- Reflection (physics)
- Diffuse reflection
