= Earth phase =

Phases of Earth as seen from the Moon

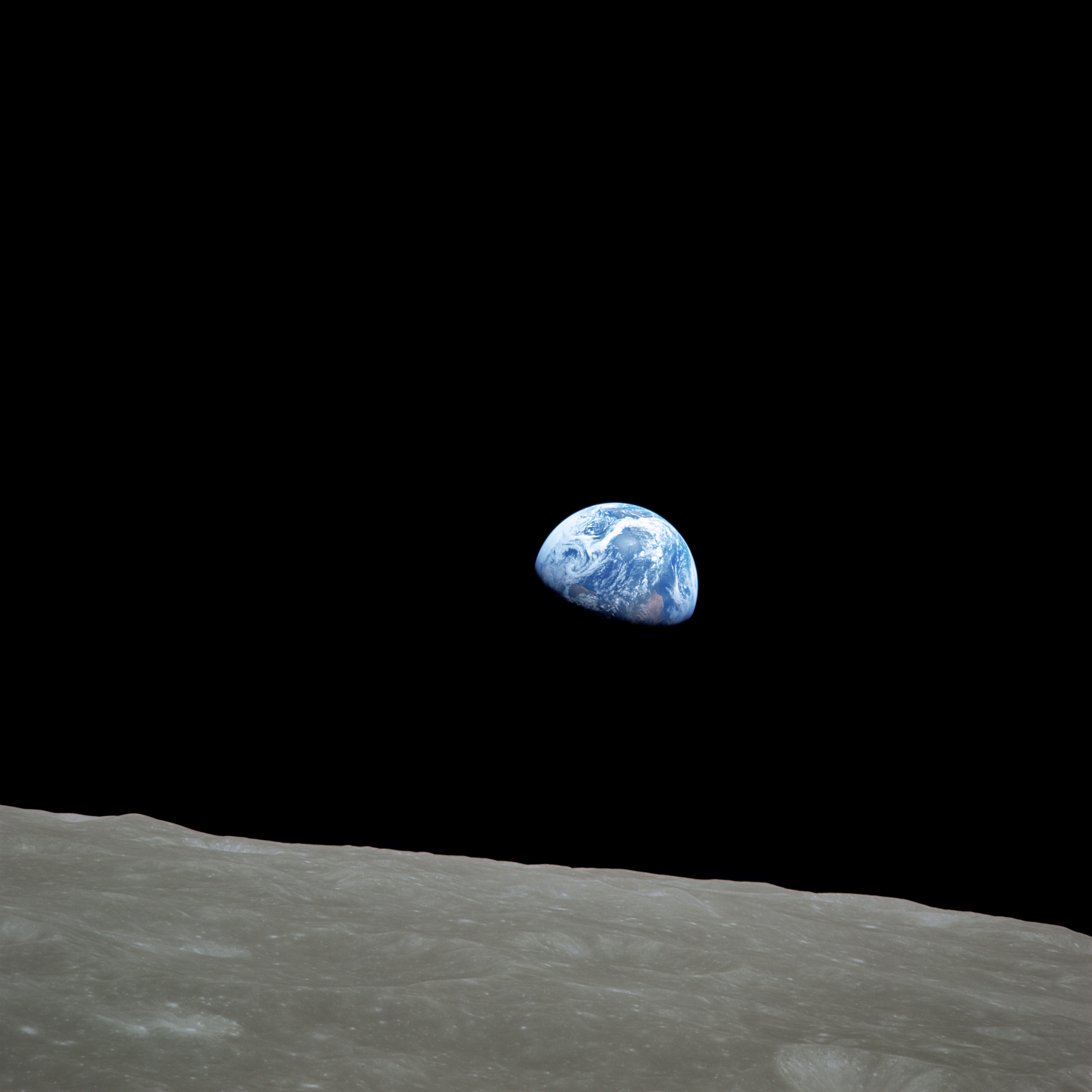
- Earthrise by Apollo 8 astronaut William Anders, December 1968. Earth at gibbous phase as seen from the Moon.

The Earth phase is the shape of the directly sunlit portion of Earth as viewed from the Moon (or elsewhere extraterrestrially). From the Moon, Earth phases gradually and cyclically change over the period of a synodic month (about 29.53 days), as the orbital positions of the Moon around Earth and of Earth around the Sun shift.

== Viewing Earth from the Moon ==
The most prominent feature in the Moon's sky, after the Sun, is Earth.

The angular diameter of Earth as seen from the Moon (Earth's apparent size in the lunar sky) averages 1.9°, which is four times the angular diameter of the Moon as seen from Earth (the Moon's apparent size in Earth's sky). Because the Moon's orbit is eccentric, Earth's angular diameter in the lunar sky varies up or down by about 5% (ranges between 1.8° and 2.0° in diameter).

Earth's albedo is three times that of the Moon (due in part to its whitish cloud cover) and, coupled with the wider area, the full Earth glows over 50 times brighter than the full Moon at zenith does for a terrestrial observer. Some of the sunlight scattered by the Earth shines on the Moon. That makes the un-sunlit half bright enough to be visible from Earth, even to the unaided eye – a phenomenon known as earthshine.

As a result of the Moon's synchronous rotation, one side of the Moon (the "near side") permanently faces Earth, and the other side (the "far side") mostly cannot be seen from Earth. This means, conversely, that Earth can be seen only from the near side of the Moon and is always invisible from the far side. Earth is seen from the lunar surface to rotate, with a period of approximately one Earth day (differing slightly due to the Moon's orbital motion).

If the Moon's rotation were purely synchronous, Earth would not have any noticeable movement in the Moon's sky. However, due to the Moon's libration, Earth does perform a slow and complex wobbling movement. Once a month, as seen from the Moon, Earth traces out an approximate oval 18° in diameter. The exact shape and orientation of this oval depend on one's location on the Moon. As a result, near the boundary of the near and far sides of the Moon, Earth is sometimes below the horizon and sometimes above it.

== Phases of Earth ==
Earth's phase changes angle throughout the seasons due to Earth's axial tilt, here viewed from geostationary orbit.

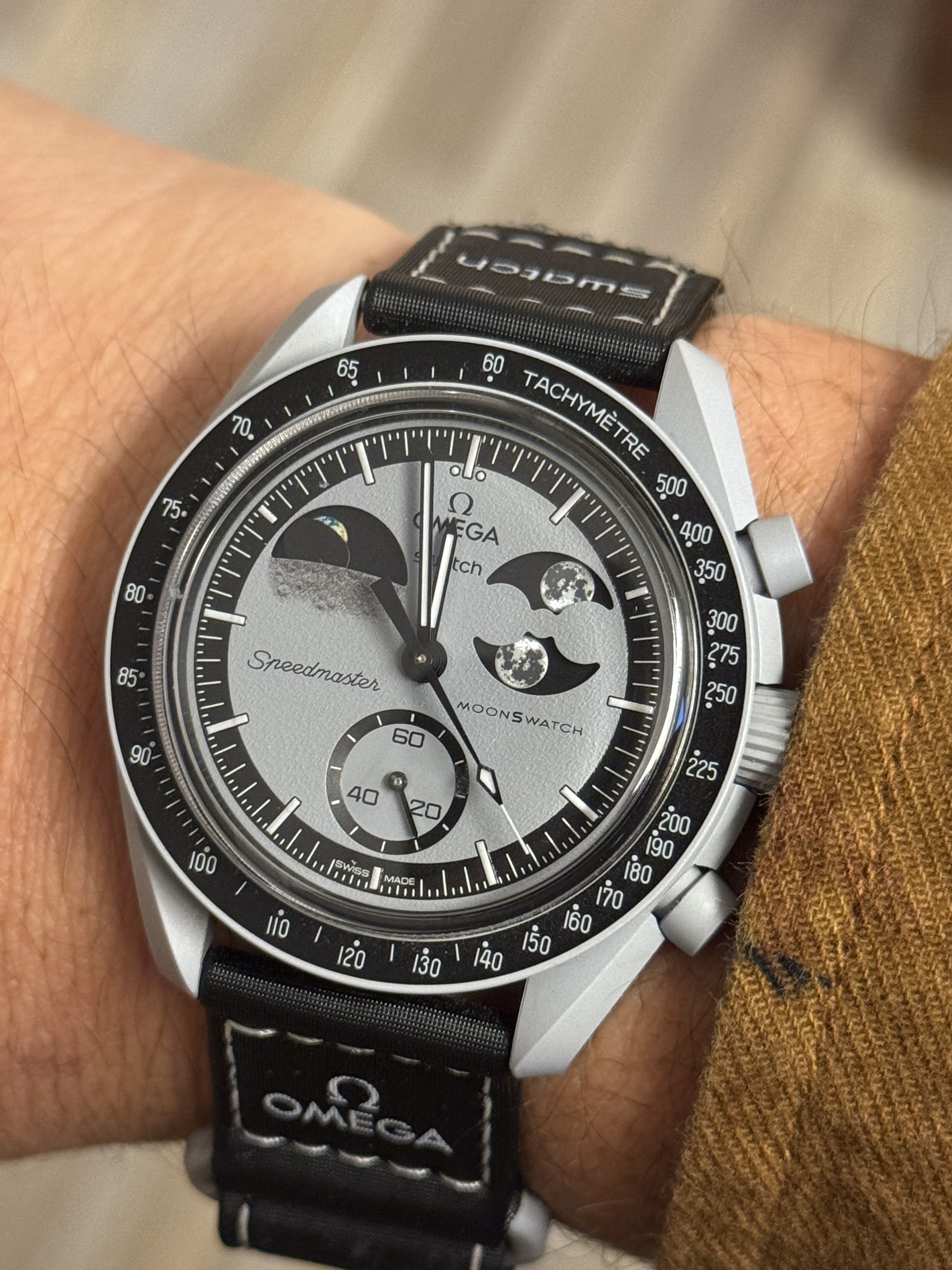
A watch featuring Earth-phase and lunar-phase complications, showing the Earth as a waxing crescent as seen from the lunar surface, while the moon is waning gibbous.

An observer on the Moon sees Earth phases, just as an observer on the Earth sees lunar phases. (Both see planetary phases.) Earth phases and Lunar phases are opposite: when terrestrial observers see a full Moon, lunar observers see a "new Earth", and vice versa.

Earth phases

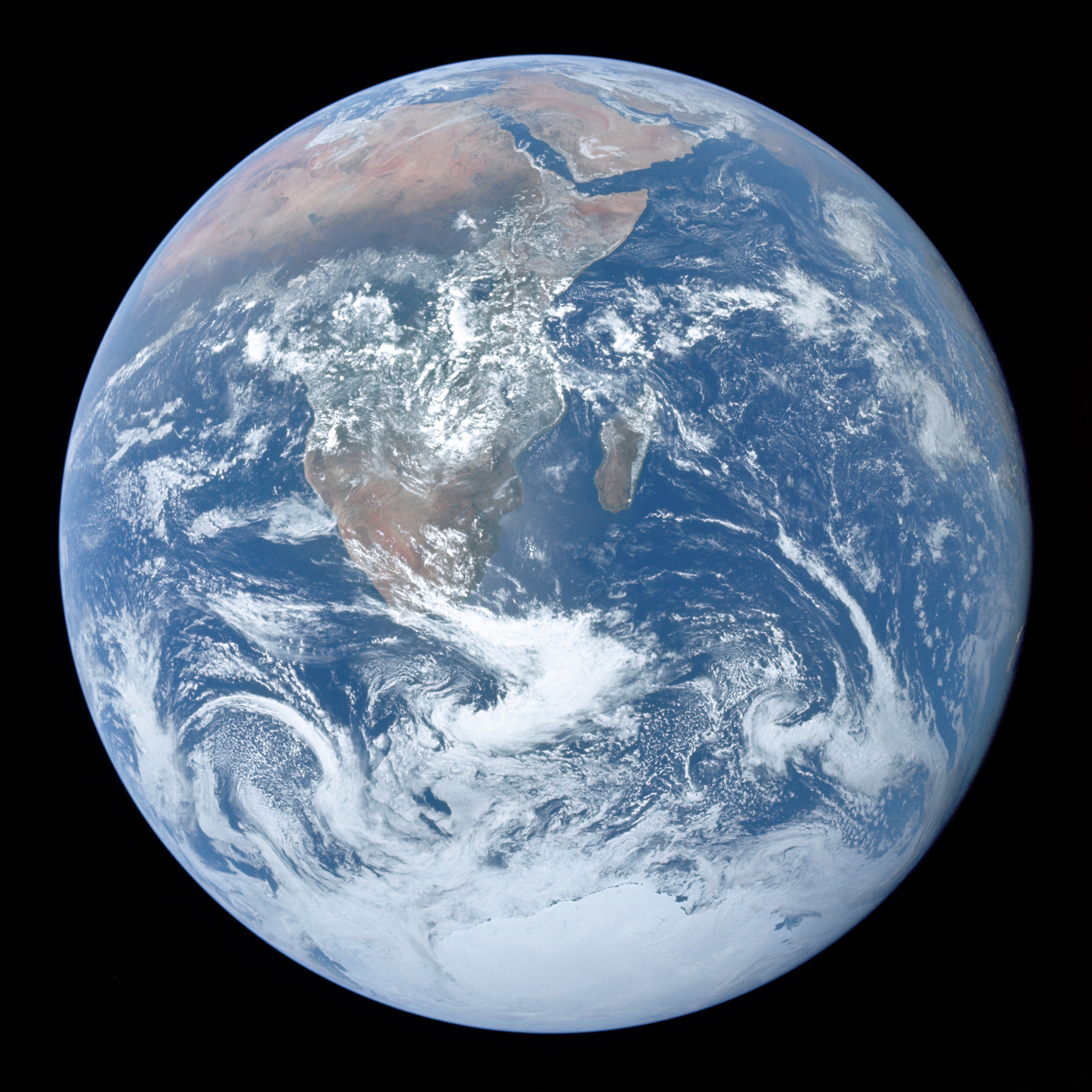
Full

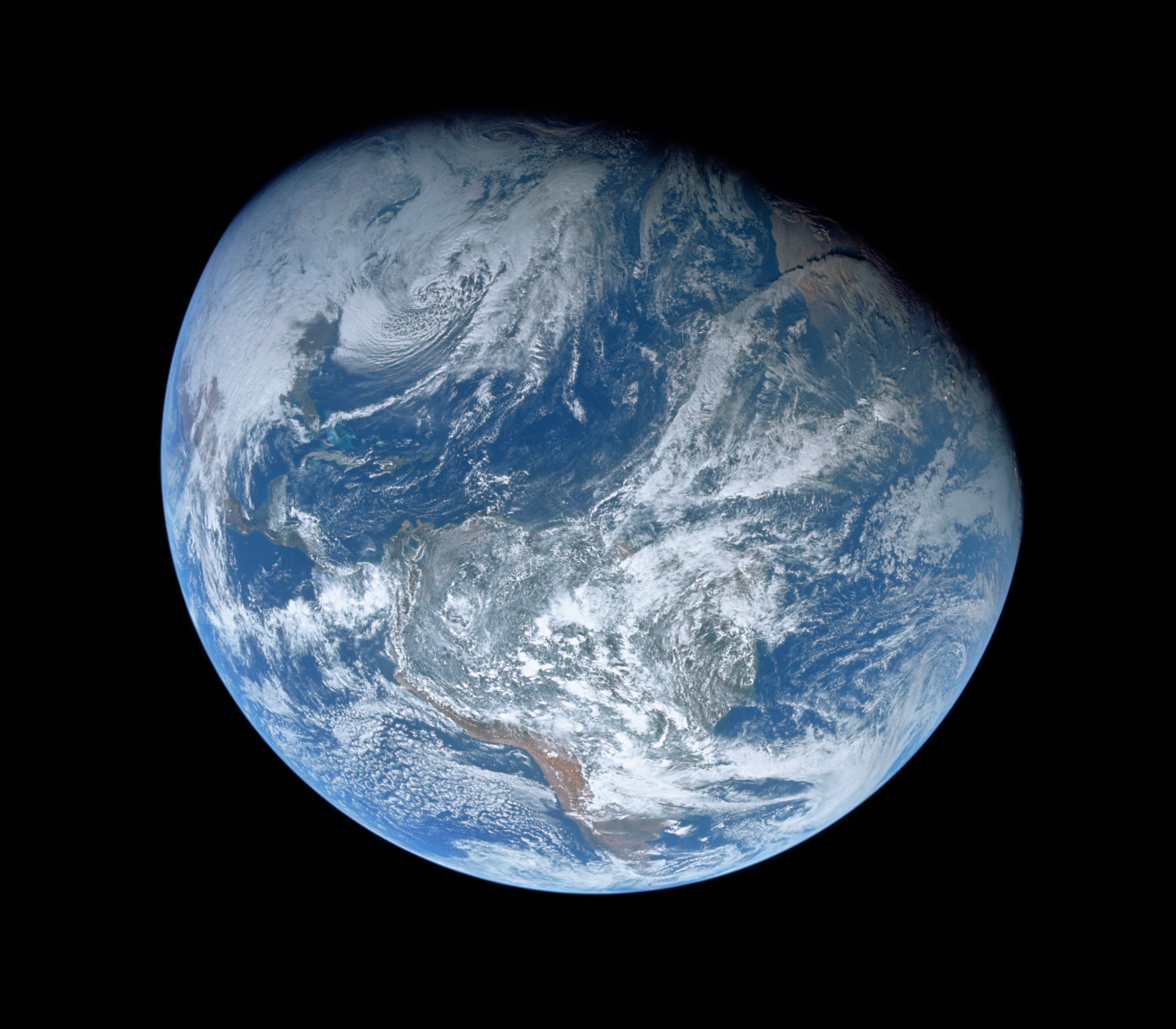
Gibbous

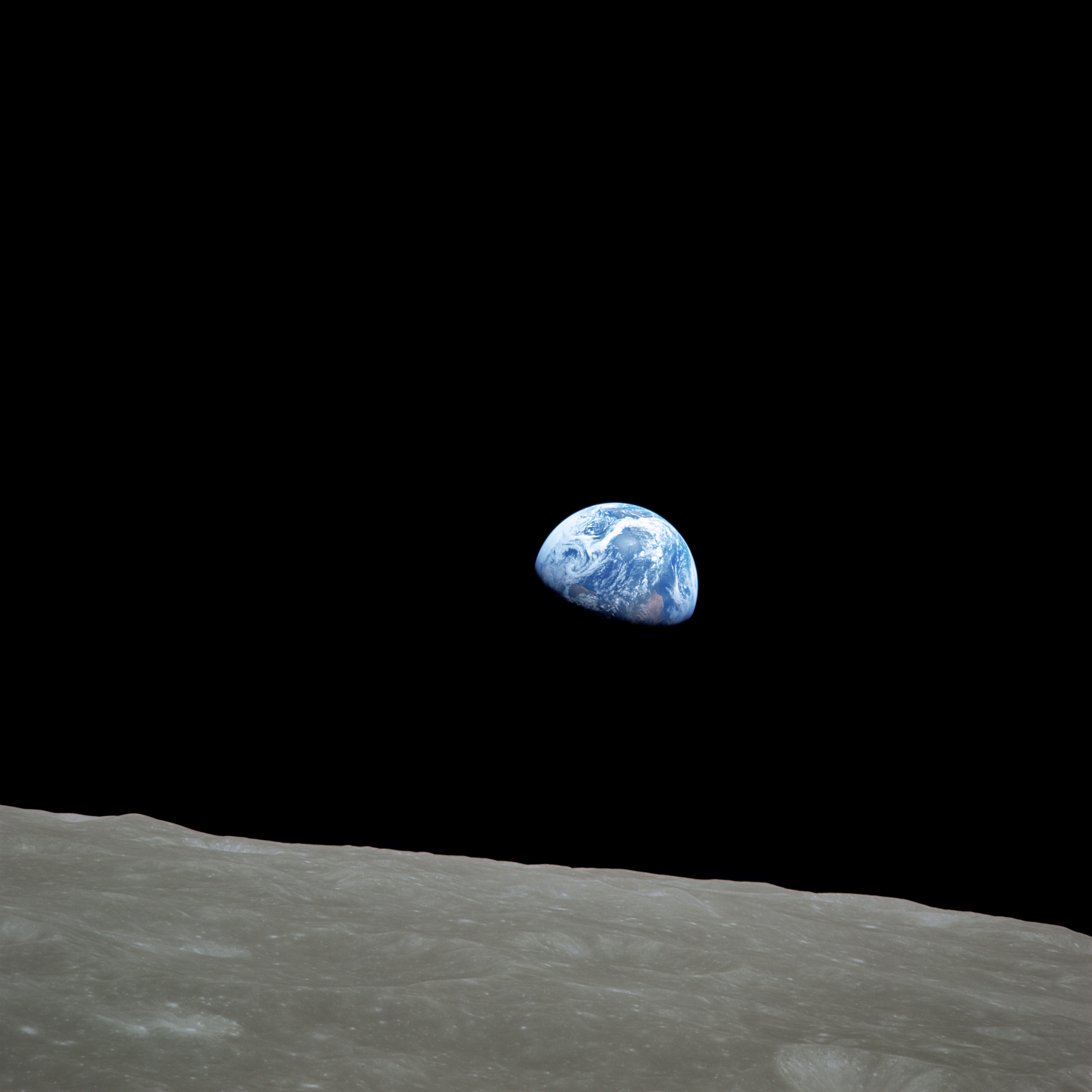
Low-illumination gibbous

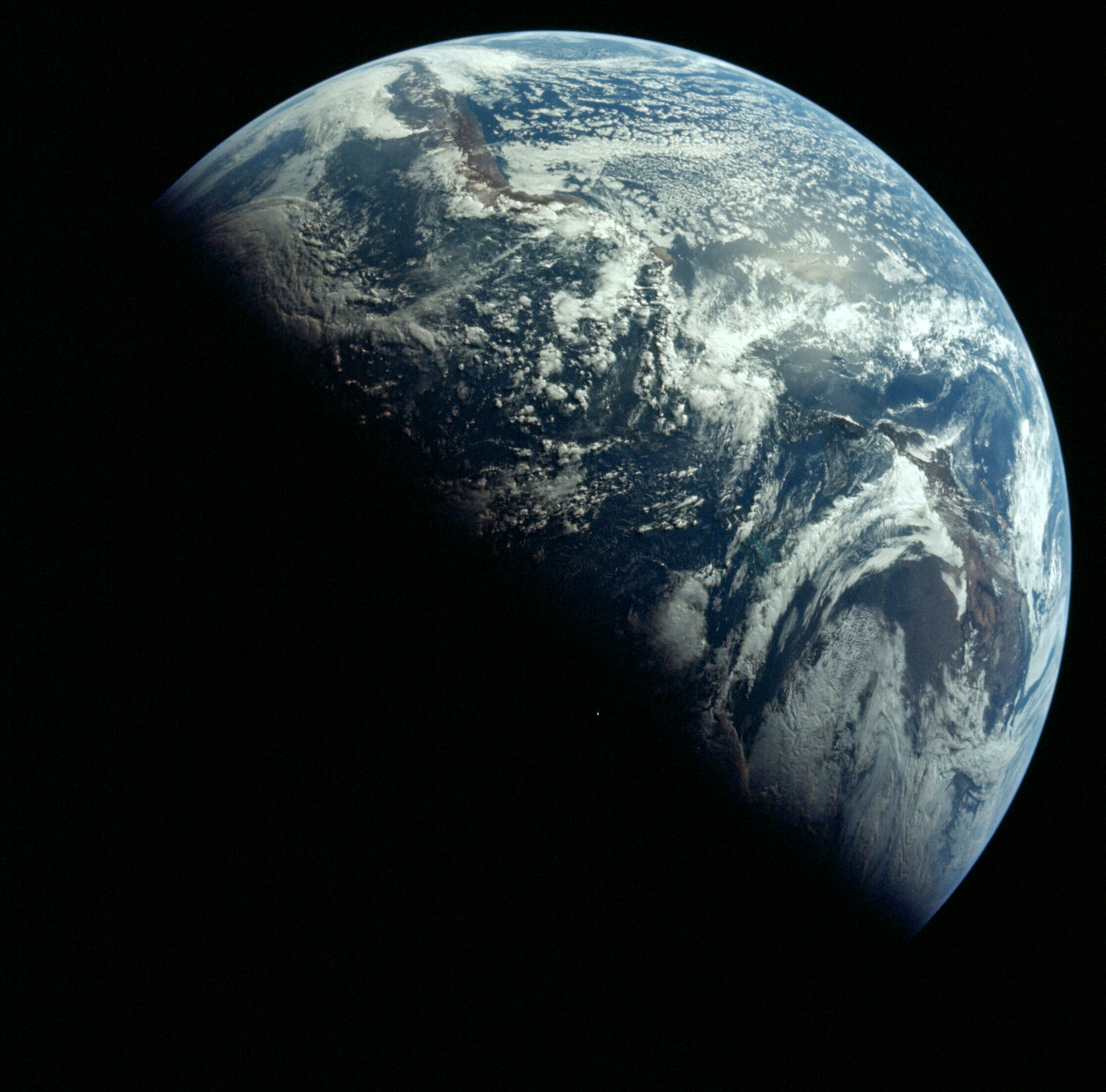
Very low-illumination gibbous

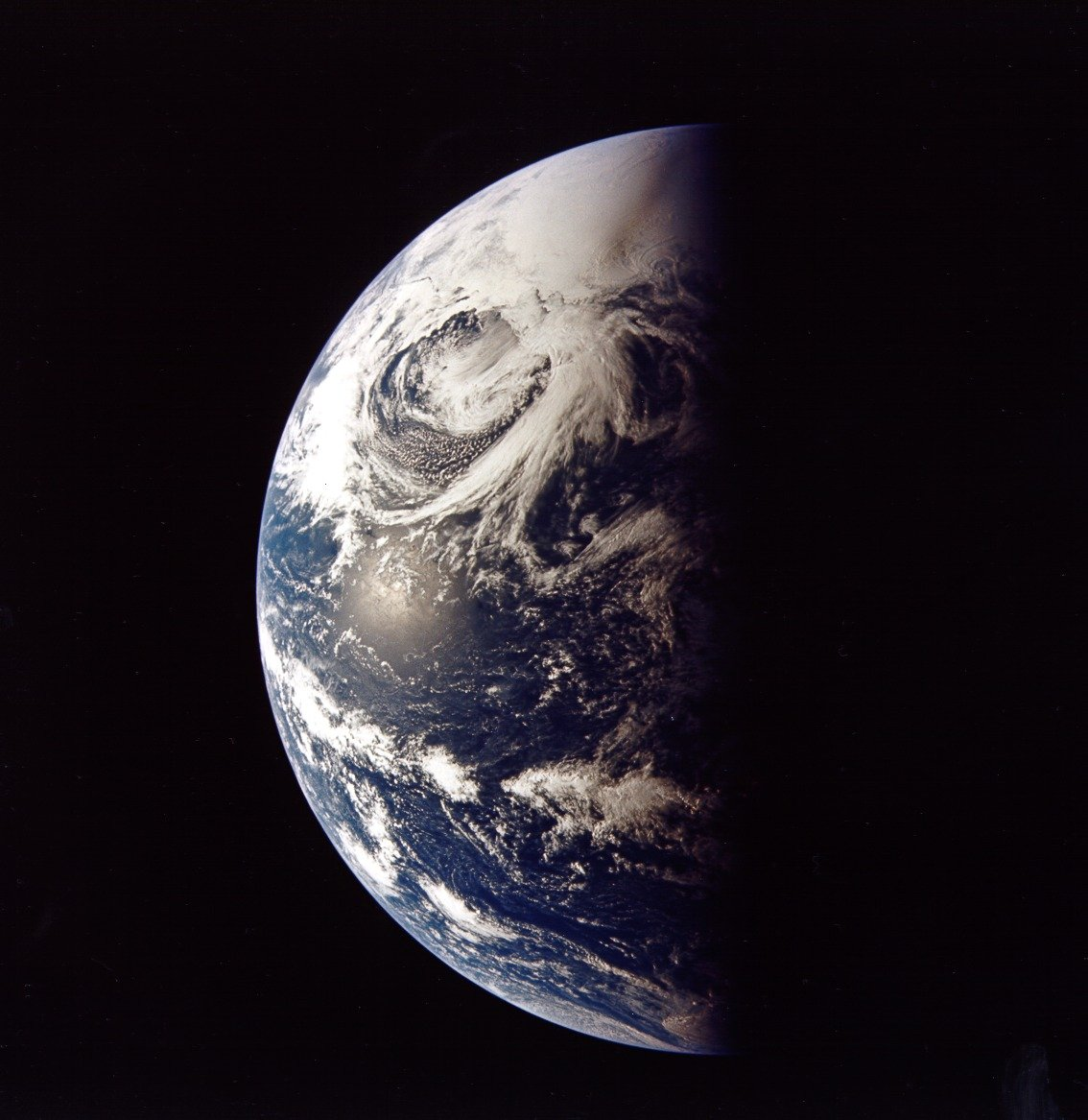
Half

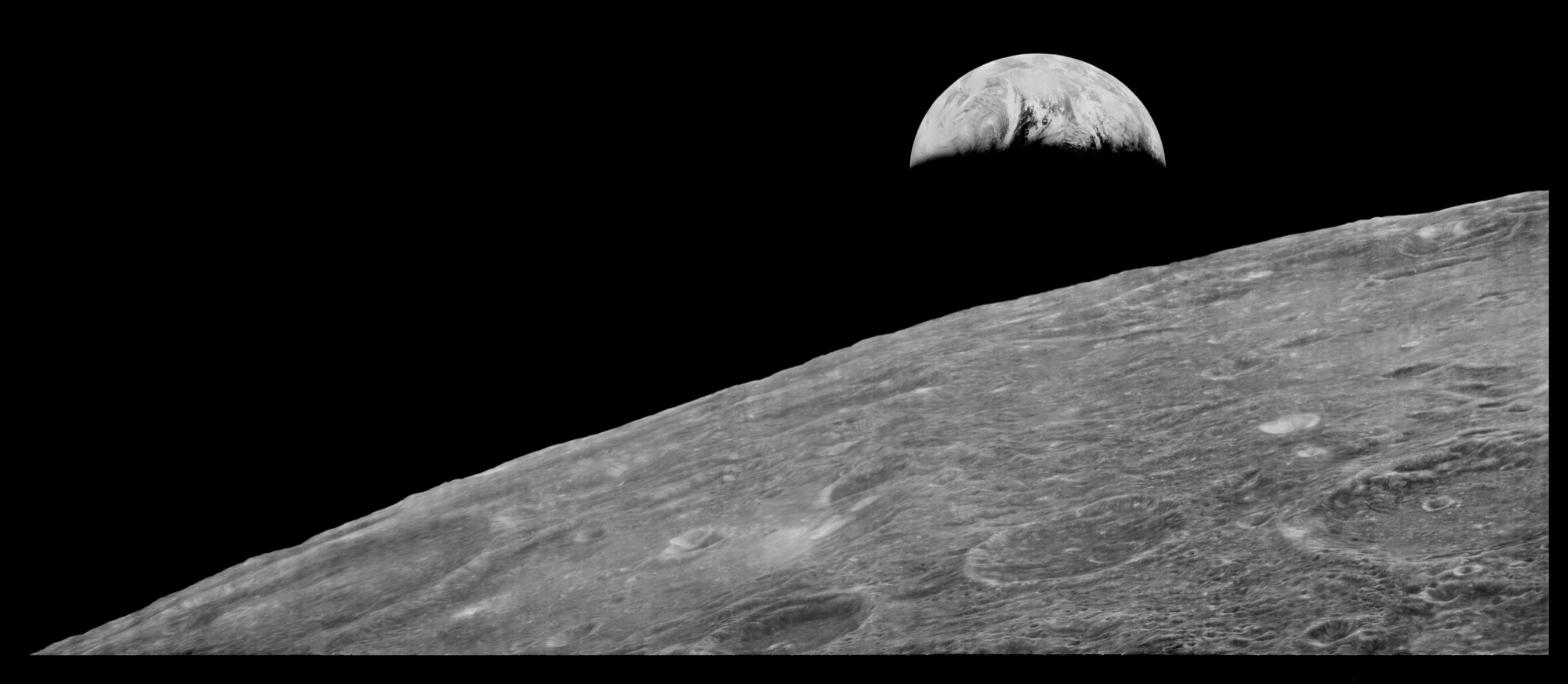
High-illumination crescent

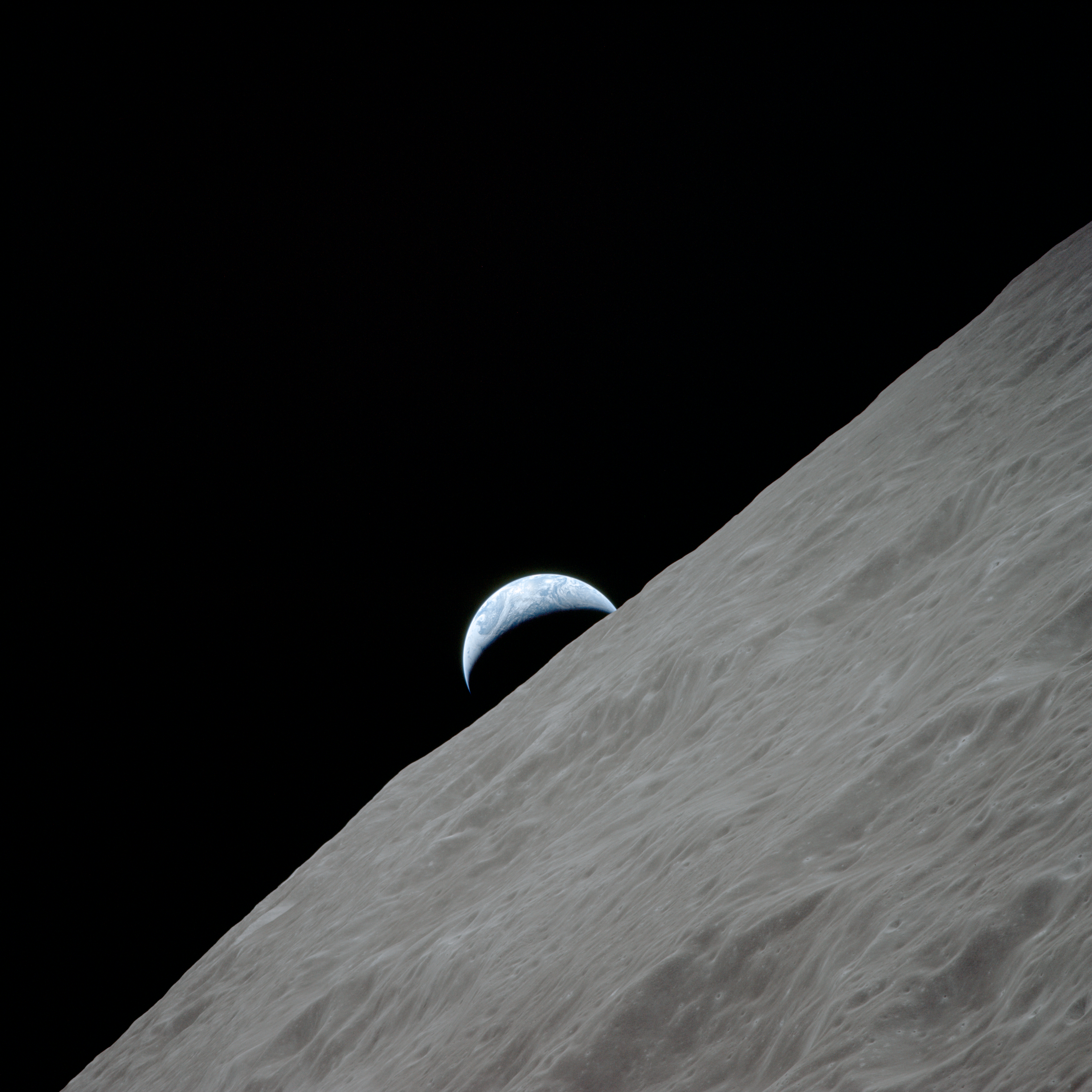
Crescent

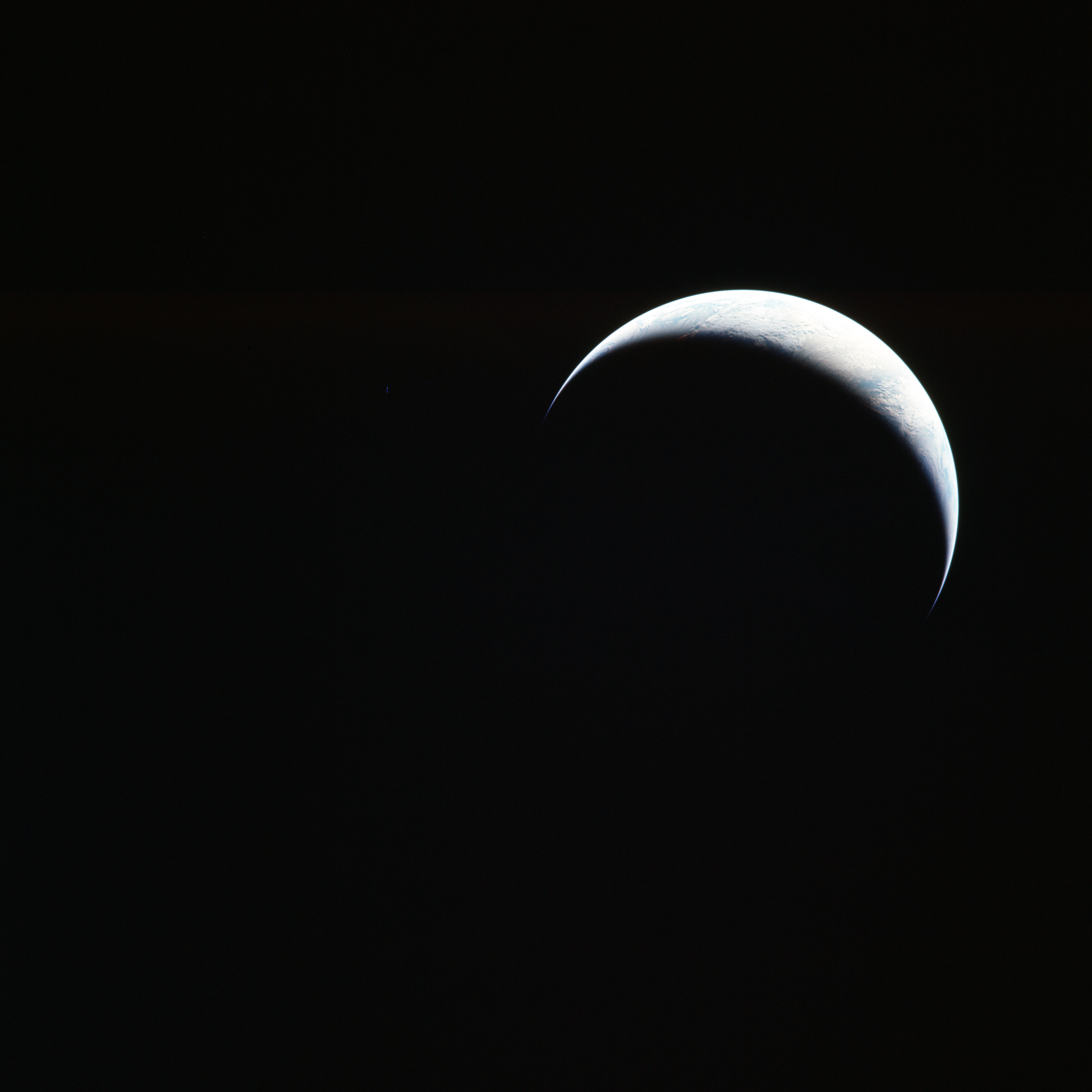
Low-illumination crescent

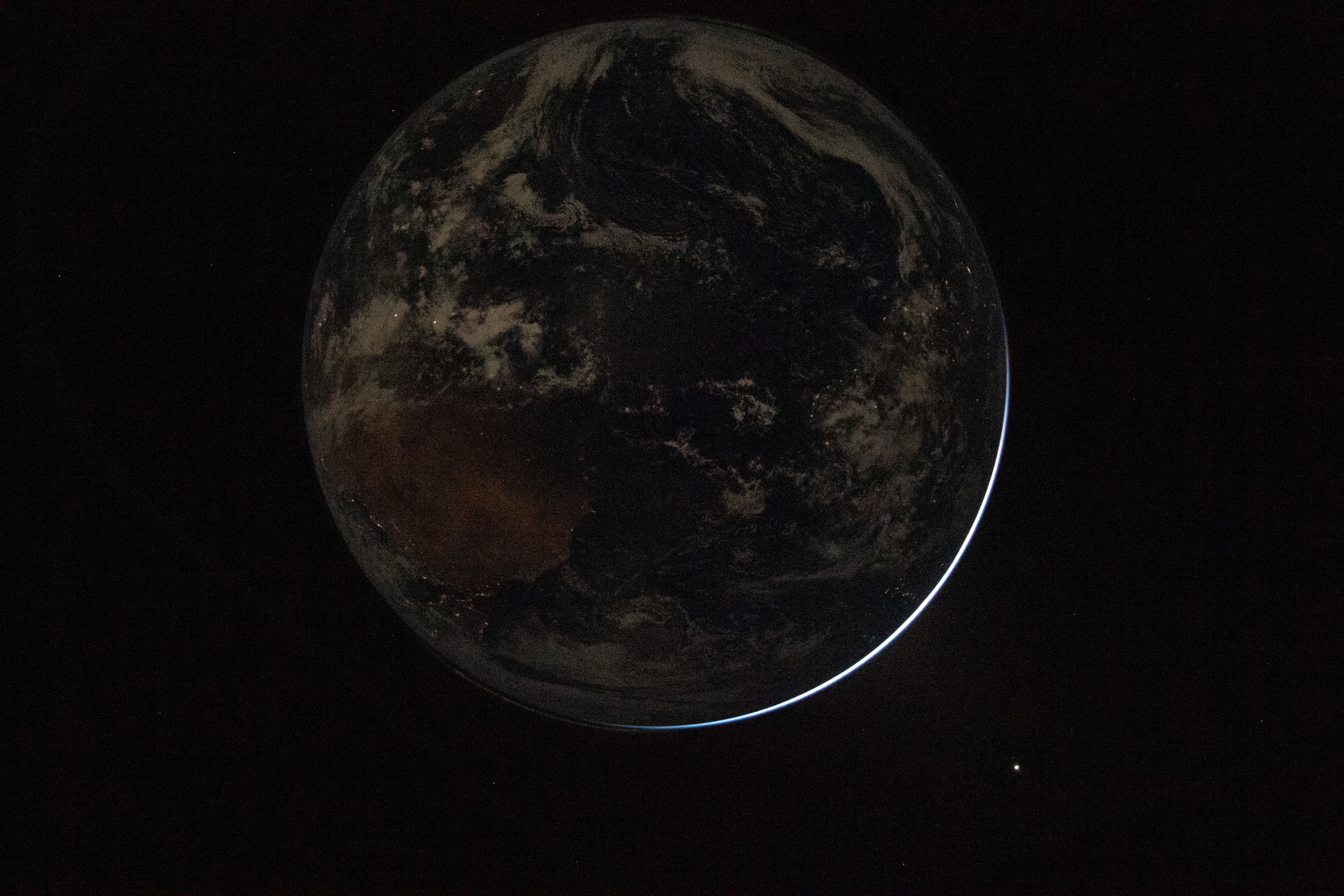
new Earth (with night side illuminated by moonshine)

== See also ==
- Extraterrestrial sky
- Timeline of first images of Earth from space
- List of notable images of Earth from space
  - The Blue Marble
  - Earthrise
  - Pale Blue Dot
- The Day the Earth Smiled
- Lunar phase
- Overview effect
- Planetary phase
