= Planetary phase =

Part of planet seen to reflect sunlight

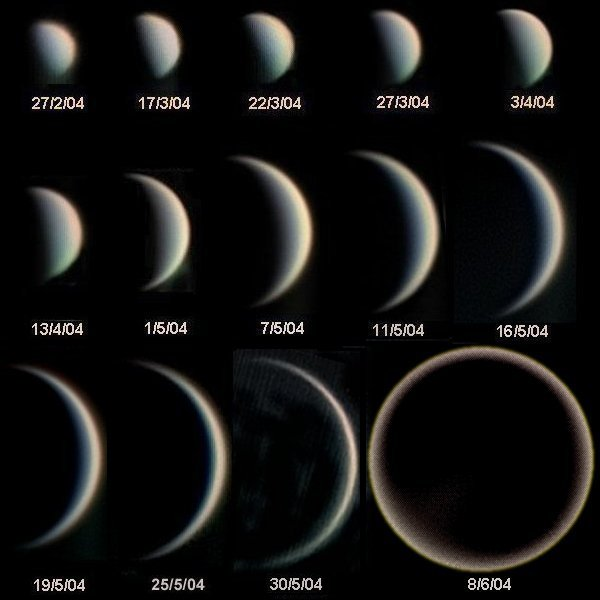
The evolution of the apparent diameter and phases of Venus

A diagram depicting planetary phases.

A planetary phase is a certain portion of a planet's area that reflects sunlight as viewed from a given vantage point, as well as the period of time during which it occurs. The phase is determined by the phase angle, which is the angle between the planet, the Sun and the Earth.

== Inferior planets ==
The two inferior planets, Mercury and Venus, which have orbits that are smaller than the Earth's, exhibit the full range of phases as does the Moon, when seen through a telescope. Their phases are "full" when they are at superior conjunction, on the far side of the Sun as seen from the Earth. It is possible to see them at these times, since their orbits are not exactly in the plane of Earth's orbit, so they usually appear to pass slightly above or below the Sun in the sky. Seeing them from the Earth's surface is difficult, because of sunlight scattered in Earth's atmosphere, but observers in space can see them easily if direct sunlight is blocked from reaching the observer's eyes. The planets' phases are "new" when they are at inferior conjunction, passing more or less between the Sun and the Earth. Sometimes they appear to cross the solar disk, which is called a transit of the planet. At intermediate points on their orbits, these planets exhibit the full range of crescent and gibbous phases.

== Superior planets ==
The superior planets, orbiting outside the Earth's orbit, do not exhibit a full range of phases since their maximum phase angles are smaller than 90°. Mars often appears significantly gibbous, it has a maximum phase angle of 45°. Jupiter has a maximum phase angle of 11.1° and Saturn of 6°, so their phases are almost always full.

== See also ==
- Earth phase
- Lunar phase
- Phases of Venus
