= Christopher T. Russell =

English geophysicist (born 1943)

Christopher Thomas Russell (born 1943 in St. Albans, England) is head of the Space Physics Center at the Institute of Geophysics and Planetary Physics (IGPP) at UCLA, professor in UCLA's Department of Earth, Planetary, and Space Sciences, and Director of the UCLA Branch of the California Space Grant Consortium. He received a B.Sc. from the University of Toronto in 1964 and a Ph.D. from UCLA in 1968. In 1977 he was awarded the James B. Macelwane Medal and in 2003 the John Adam Fleming Medal by the American Geophysical Union (AGU). He is also a Fellow of the AGU. Asteroid 21459 Chrisrussell was named after him in 2008. In 2017, he was awarded the NASA Distinguished Public Service Medal. He has three grandchildren.

== Research ==
- He led the Magnetic Fields Experiments on NASA's Polar satellite to map the Earth's magnetosphere.
- He led NASA's Dawn mission team. Dawn orbited Vesta in 2011 and 2012 and entered the orbit of Ceres in 2015. It was the first spacecraft to orbit two celestial bodies.
- In collaboration with John L. Philips he has studied the ashen light on Venus.
- He has studied the solar wind through his participation in NASA's STEREO and the European Space Agency's Venus Express missions.

== Selected publications ==
- C T Russell; C A Raymond; A Coradini; et al. (1 May 2012). "Dawn at Vesta: testing the protoplanetary paradigm". Science. 336 (6082): 684–686. Bibcode:2012Sci...336..684R. doi:10.1126/SCIENCE.1219381. ISSN 0036-8075. PMID 22582253. Wikidata Q34274701.
- Vassilis Angelopoulos; James P McFadden; Davin Larson; et al. (24 July 2008). "Tail reconnection triggering substorm onset". Science. 321 (5891): 931–935. Bibcode:2008Sci...321..931A. doi:10.1126/SCIENCE.1160495. ISSN 0036-8075. PMID 18653845. Wikidata Q34800459.
- S Marchi; H Y McSween; D P O'Brien; et al. (1 May 2012). "The violent collisional history of asteroid 4 Vesta". Science. LPI contribution. 336 (6082): 690–694. Bibcode:2012Sci...336..690M. doi:10.1126/SCIENCE.1218757. ISSN 0036-8075. PMID 22582255. Wikidata Q38462534.
