= Lunar phase =

Shape of the Moon's sunlit portion as viewed from Earth

Diagram of the Moon's phases shown in the outer perimeter as seen from the northern hemisphere. The Earth is at the center of the diagram and the Moon is shown orbiting.

The lunar phases and librations in 2026 as viewed from the Northern Hemisphere at hourly intervals, with titles and supplemental graphics

The lunar phases and librations in 2026 as viewed from the Southern Hemisphere at hourly intervals, with titles and supplemental graphics

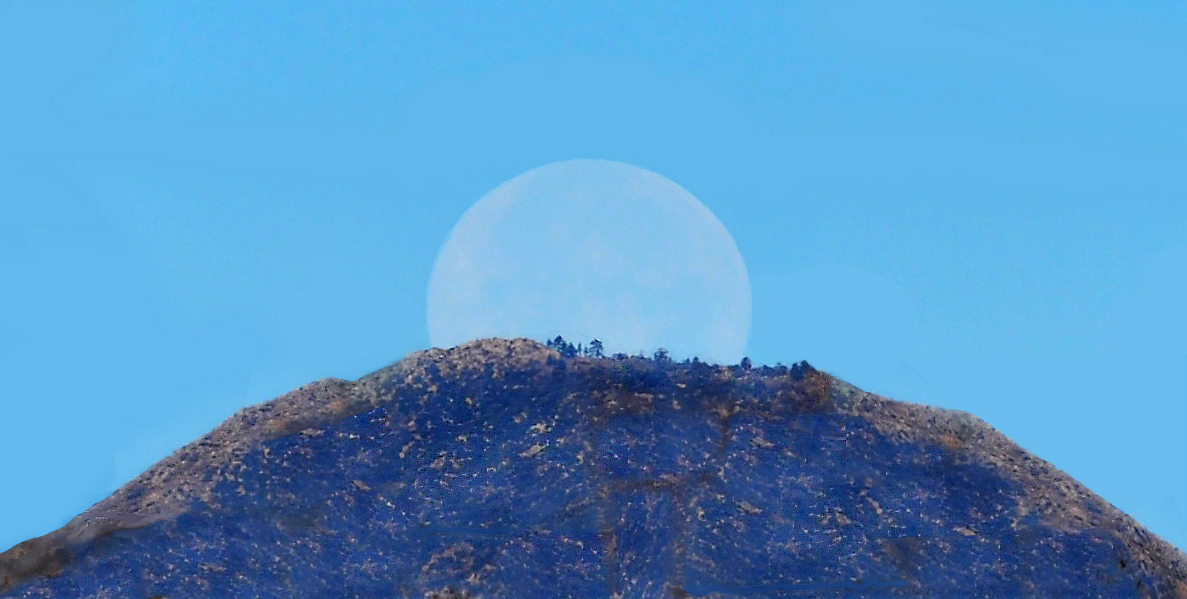
A full moon sets behind San Gorgonio Mountain in California on a midsummer's morning.

A lunar phase or Moon phase is the apparent shape of the Moon's day and night phases of the lunar day as viewed from Earth. Because the Moon is tidally locked to Earth, the cycle of phases takes one lunar month and moves across the same side of the Moon, which always faces Earth. In common usage, the four major phases are the new moon, the first quarter, the full moon, and the last quarter. The four minor phases are waxing crescent, waxing gibbous, waning gibbous, and waning crescent. A lunar month is the time between successive recurrences of the same phase: due to the eccentricity of the Moon's orbit, this duration is not perfectly constant but averages about 29.5 days.

The appearance of the lunar phases depends on the observer's latitude and is different as seen from the northern hemisphere versus the southern hemisphere. The phase changes gradually over a lunar month, as the relative orbital positions of the Moon around Earth, and Earth around the Sun, shift. The visible side of the Moon is sunlit to varying extents, depending on the position of the Moon in its orbit, with the sunlit portion varying from 0% (at new moon) to nearly 100% (at full moon).

== Principle ==
The Moon rotates as it orbits Earth, changing orientation toward the Sun experiencing a lunar day. A lunar day is equal to one lunar month (one synodic orbit around Earth) due to it being tidally locked to Earth. Since the Moon is not tidally locked to the Sun, lunar daylight and night times both occur around the Moon. The changing position of the illumination of the Moon by the Sun during a lunar day is observable from Earth as the changing lunar phases, waxing crescent being the sunrise and the waning crescent the sunset phase of a day observed from afar.

== Description ==
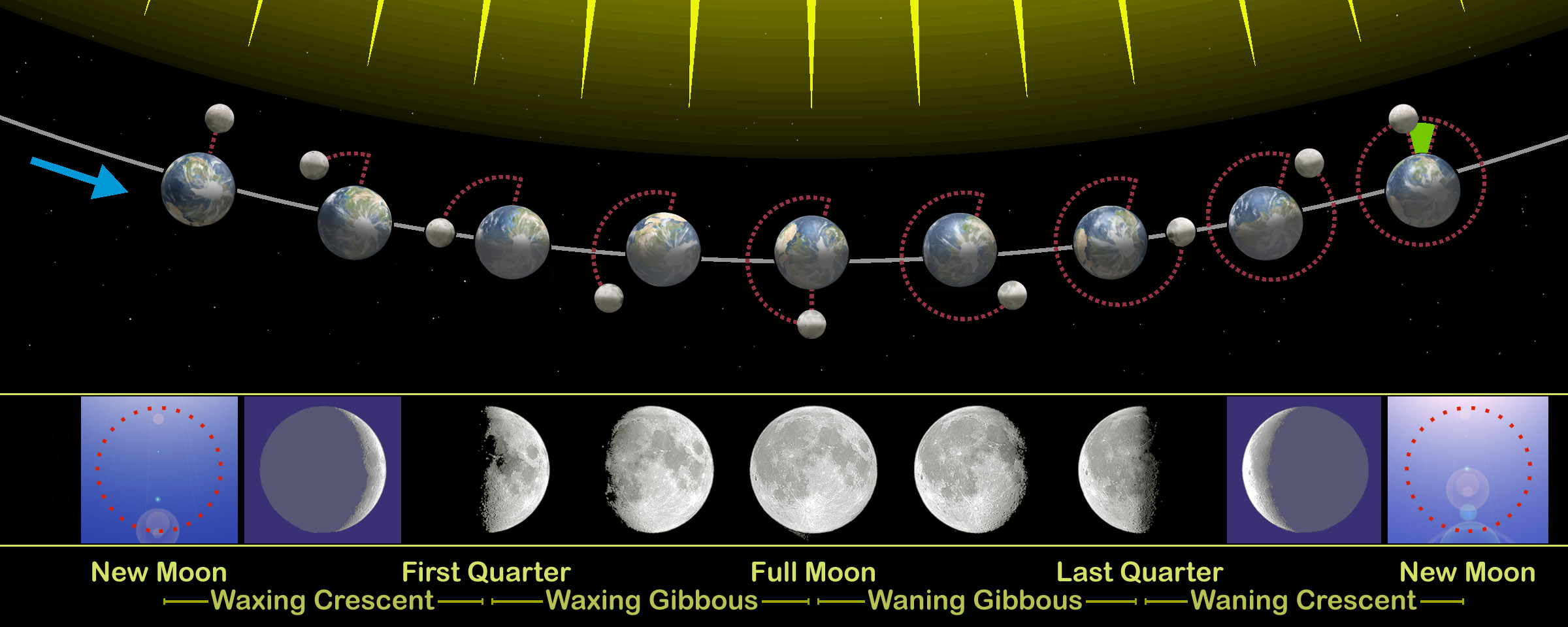
The phases of the Moon as viewed looking southward from the Northern Hemisphere. Each phase would be rotated 180° if seen looking northward from the Southern Hemisphere. The upper part of the diagram is not to scale, as the Moon, the Earth, and the Moon's orbit are all much smaller relative to the Earth's orbit than shown here.

There are four principal (primary, or major) lunar phases: the new moon, first quarter, full moon, and last quarter (also known as third or final quarter), when the Moon's ecliptic longitude is at an angle to the Sun (as viewed from the center of the Earth) of 0°, 90°, 180°, and 270° respectively. (Note: The quarter phases happen when the observer–Moon–Sun angle is 90°, also known as quadrature. This is not the same as a right angle, but the difference is very slight. /) Each of these phases appears at slightly different times at different locations on Earth, and tabulated times are therefore always geocentric (calculated for the Earth's center).

Between the principal phases are intermediate phases, during which the apparent shape of the illuminated Moon is either crescent or gibbous. On average, the intermediate phases last one-quarter of a synodic month, or 7.38 days. (Note: Their durations vary slightly because the Moon's orbit is somewhat elliptical, so its orbital speed is not constant.)

The term waxing is used for an intermediate phase when the Moon's apparent shape is thickening, from new to a full moon; and waning when the shape is thinning. The duration from full moon to new moon (or new moon to full moon) varies from approximately 13 days 22 1/2 hours to about 15 days 14 1/2 hours.

Due to lunar motion relative to the meridian and the ecliptic, in Earth's Northern Hemisphere:

- A new moon appears highest at the summer solstice and lowest at the winter solstice.
- A first-quarter moon appears highest at the spring equinox and lowest at the autumn equinox.
- A full moon appears highest at the winter solstice and lowest at the summer solstice.
- A last-quarter moon appears highest at the autumn equinox and lowest at the spring equinox.

Non-Western cultures may use a different number of lunar phases; for example, traditional Hawaiian culture has a total of 30 phases (one per day).

=== Waxing and waning ===
This video provides an illustration of how the Moon passes through its phases – a product of its orbit, which allows different parts of its surface to be illuminated by the Sun over the course of a month. The camera is locked to the Moon as Earth rapidly rotates in the foreground.

When the Sun and Moon are aligned on the same side of the Earth (conjunct), the Moon is "new", and the side of the Moon facing Earth is not illuminated by the Sun. As the Moon waxes (the amount of illuminated surface as seen from Earth increases), the lunar phases progress through the new moon, crescent moon, first-quarter moon, gibbous moon, and full moon phases. The Moon then wanes as it passes through the gibbous moon, third-quarter moon, and crescent moon phases, before returning back to new moon.

The terms old moon and new moon are not interchangeable. The "old moon" is a waning sliver (which eventually becomes undetectable to the naked eye) until the moment it aligns with the Sun and begins to wax, at which point it becomes new again. Half moon is often used to mean the first- and third-quarter moons, while the term quarter refers to the extent of the Moon's cycle around the Earth, not its shape.

When an illuminated hemisphere is viewed from a certain angle, the portion of the illuminated area that is visible will have a two-dimensional shape as defined by the intersection of an ellipse and circle (in which the ellipse's major axis coincides with the circle's diameter). If the half-ellipse is convex with respect to the half-circle, then the shape will be gibbous (bulging outwards), whereas if the half-ellipse is concave with respect to the half-circle, then the shape will be a crescent. When a crescent moon occurs, the phenomenon of earthshine may be apparent, where the night side of the Moon dimly reflects indirect sunlight reflected from Earth.

=== Principal and intermediate phases of the Moon ===
Moon phases		Illuminated portion		Visibility	Average moonrise time (Note: As with sunrise and sunset, there are seasonal variations in the time of moonrise and moonset.)	Culmination time (highest point)	Average moonset time	Illustrations from		Photograph (view from the Northern Hemisphere)
Moon phases		Northern Hemisphere	Southern Hemisphere	Visibility	Average moonrise time	Culmination time (highest point)	Average moonset time	North Pole	South Pole	Photograph (view from the Northern Hemisphere)
New Moon		Disc completely in shade (lit by earthshine only)		Invisible (too close to Sun), except during a total or annular solar eclipse (when the Moon obscures the Sun disc)	06:00	12:00	18:00			
Waxing moon	Waxing crescent	Right side: (1%–49%) lit disc	Left side: (1%–49%) lit disc	Late morning to post-dusk	09:00	15:00	21:00			
Waxing moon	First quarter	Right side: 50% lit disc	Left side: 50% lit disc	Afternoon and early night	12:00	18:00	00:00			
Waxing moon	Waxing gibbous	Right side: (51%–99%) lit disc	Left side: (51%–99%) lit disc	Late afternoon and most of night	15:00	21:00	03:00			
Full Moon		100% illuminated disc, except during a total or partial lunar eclipse (when the Moon crosses the Earth's shadow)		Sunset to sunrise (all night)	18:00	00:00	06:00			
Waning moon	Waning gibbous	Left side: (99%–51%) lit disc	Right side: (99%–51%) lit disc	Most of night and early morning	21:00	03:00	09:00			
Waning moon	Last quarter	Left side: 50% lit disc	Right side: 50% lit disc	Late night and morning	00:00	06:00	12:00			
Waning moon	Waning crescent	Left side: (49%–1%) lit disc	Right side: (49%–1%) lit disc	Pre-dawn to early afternoon	03:00	09:00	15:00			

== Timekeeping ==
Although the first formal calendar was created in Mesopotamia about 5,000 years ago, archaeologists have identified methods of timekeeping based on the lunar cycle that go back to prehistoric times. For example, marks in a site in Scotland, dated to 10,000 years ago, are thought to have been a lunisolar calendar. According to the interpretation, this calendar marked both the lunar cycle and the midwinter solstice, showing a recognition that it needed to be recalibrated every year because the lunar year is shorter than the solar year.

The natural units for timekeeping used by most historical societies are the day, the solar year and the lunation. The first crescent of the new moon provides a clear and regular marker in time and pure lunar calendars (such as the Islamic Hijri calendar) rely completely on this metric. The fact, however, that a year of twelve lunar months is ten or eleven days shorter than the solar year means that a lunar calendar drifts out of step with the seasons. Lunisolar calendars resolve this issue with a year of thirteen lunar months every few years, or by restarting the count at the first new (or full) moon after the winter solstice. The Sumerian calendar is the first recorded to have used the former method; Chinese calendar uses the latter, despite delaying its start until the second or even third new moon after the solstice. The Hindu calendar, also a lunisolar calendar, further divides the month into two fourteen day periods that mark the waxing moon and the waning moon.

The ancient Roman calendar began as a purely lunar calendar, but later evolved into a lunisolar one. On the decree of Julius Caesar in the first century BCE, Rome changed to a solar calendar of twelve months, each of a fixed number of days except in a leap year. This, the Julian calendar (slightly revised in 1582 to correct the leap year rule), is the basis for the Gregorian calendar that is almost exclusively the civil calendar in use worldwide today.

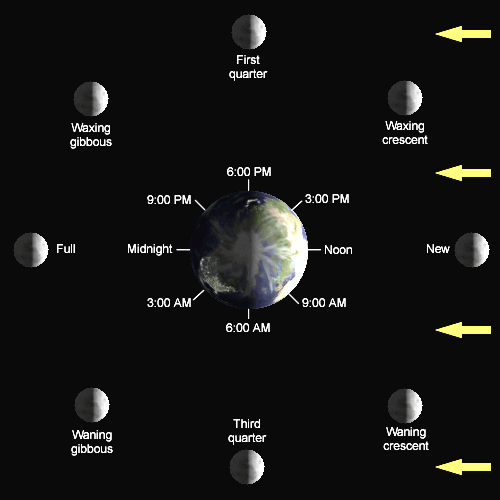
The time of day at a location on Earth (except at the poles) can be inferred from the culmination of the Moon in the sky and its phase: each lunar phase culminates closest to the zenith (being exactly south or north of it, crossing the meridian) in the sky at a specific daytime, as marked in the diagram, rising (east) and setting (west) during the time of the day preceding and succeeding the culmination.

== Calculating phase ==
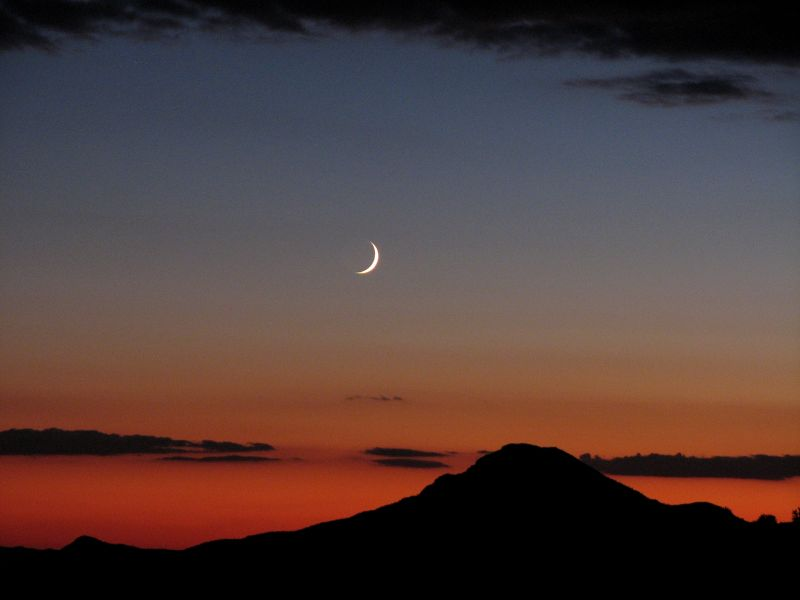
A crescent Moon over Kingman, Arizona

The number of days counted from the time of the new moon is the Moon's "age". Each complete cycle of phases is called a "lunation".

The approximate age of the Moon, and hence the approximate phase, can be calculated for any date by calculating the number of days since a known new moon (such as 1 January 1900 or 11 August 1999) and reducing this modulo 29.53059 days (the mean length of a synodic month). (Note: Lunar months vary in length about the mean by up to seven hours in any given year. In 2001, the synodic months varied from 29d 19h 14m in January to 29d 07h 11m in July.) The difference between two dates can be calculated by subtracting the Julian day number of one from that of the other, or there are simpler formulae giving (for instance) the number of days since 31 December 1899. However, this calculation assumes a perfectly circular orbit and makes no allowance for the time of day at which the new moon occurred and therefore may be incorrect by several hours. (It also becomes less accurate the larger the difference between the required date and the reference date.) It is accurate enough to use in a novelty clock application showing lunar phase, but specialist usage taking account of lunar apogee and perigee requires a more elaborate calculation. Also, due to lunar libration it is not uncommon to see up to 101% of the full moon or even up to 5% of the lunar backside.

=== Calculating phase size ===
The phase is equal to the area of the visible lunar sphere that is illuminated by the Sun. This area or degree of illumination is given by $(1-\cos \theta)/2=\sin^2(\theta/2)$, where $\theta$ is the elongation (i.e., the angle between Moon, the observer on Earth, and the Sun).

== Orientation by latitude ==
The observed orientation of the Moon at different phases from different latitudes on Earth (the different orientation displayed between the phases at each latitude show merely the extremes of orientation due to libration)

In the Northern Hemisphere, if the left side of the Moon is dark, then the bright part is thickening, and the Moon is described as waxing (shifting toward full moon). If the right side of the Moon is dark, then the bright part is thinning, and the Moon is described as waning (past full and shifting toward new moon). Assuming that the viewer is in the Northern Hemisphere, the right side of the Moon is the part that is always waxing. (That is, if the right side is dark, the Moon is becoming darker; if the right side is lit, the Moon is getting brighter.)

In the Southern Hemisphere, the Moon is observed from a perspective inverted, or rotated 180°, to that of the Northern and to all of the images in this article, so that the opposite sides appear to wax or wane.

Closer to the Equator, the lunar terminator will appear horizontal during the morning and evening. Since the above descriptions of the lunar phases only apply at middle or high latitudes, observers moving towards the tropics from northern or southern latitudes will see the Moon rotated anti-clockwise or clockwise with respect to the images in this article.

The lunar crescent can open upward or downward, with the "horns" of the crescent pointing up or down, respectively. When the Sun appears above the Moon in the sky, the crescent opens downward; when the Moon is above the Sun, the crescent opens upward. The crescent Moon is most clearly and brightly visible when the Sun is below the horizon, which implies that the Moon must be above the Sun, and the crescent must open upward. This is therefore the orientation in which the crescent Moon is most often seen from the tropics. The waxing and waning crescents look very similar. The waxing crescent appears in the western sky in the evening, and the waning crescent in the eastern sky in the morning.

== Other observational phenomena ==
=== Lunar libration ===
Animation showing progression of the Moon's phases.

The eccentricity of Moon's orbit leads to slight variation in its apparent size as viewed from Earth, and also causes it to be seen from slightly different angles at different times.

The effect is subtle to the naked eye, from night to night, but it can be seen in time-lapse photography.

Lunar libration causes part of the back side of the Moon to be visible to a terrestrial observer some of the time. Because of this, around 59% of the Moon's surface has been imaged from the ground.

=== Effect of parallax ===
The Earth subtends an angle of about two degrees when seen from the Moon. This means that an observer on Earth who sees the Moon when it is close to the eastern horizon sees it from an angle that is about 2 degrees different from the line of sight of an observer who sees the Moon on the western horizon. The Moon moves about 12 degrees around its orbit per day, so, if these observers were stationary, they would see the phases of the Moon at times that differ by about one-sixth of a day, or 4 hours. But in reality, the observers are on the surface of the rotating Earth, so someone who sees the Moon on the eastern horizon at one moment sees it on the western horizon about 12 hours later. This adds an oscillation to the apparent progression of the lunar phases. They appear to occur more slowly when the Moon is high in the sky than when it is below the horizon. The Moon appears to move jerkily, and the phases do the same. The amplitude of this oscillation is never more than about four hours, which is a small fraction of a month. It does not have any obvious effect on the appearance of the Moon. It does however affect accurate calculations of the times of lunar phases.

=== Earthlight ===
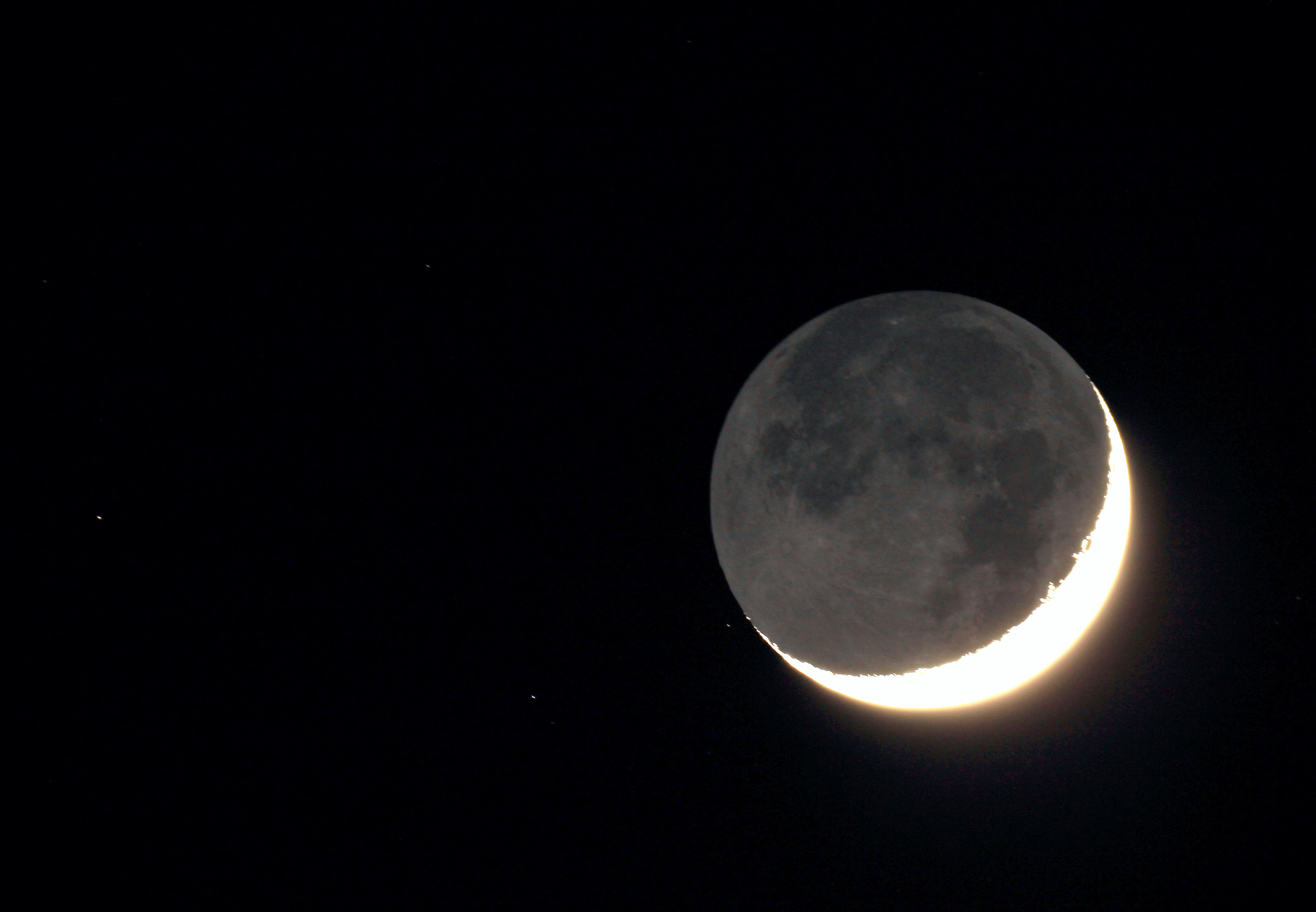
An overexposed photograph of a crescent Moon reveals earthshine and stars.

When the Moon seen from Earth is a thin crescent, Earth viewed from the Moon is almost fully lit by the Sun. The dark side of the Moon is dimly illuminated by sunlight reflected from Earth, called earthshine, which is bright enough to be easily visible from Earth. This is sometimes referred to as "the old moon in the new moon's arms" during a waning crescent or "the new moon in the old moon's arms" during a waxing crescent.

== Misconceptions ==
=== Orbital period ===
It can be confusing that the Moon's orbital sidereal period is 27.3 days while the phases complete a cycle once every 29.5 days (synodic period). This is due to the Earth's orbit around the Sun. The Moon orbits the Earth 13.4 times a year, but only passes between the Earth and Sun 12.4 times.

=== Eclipses ===
As the Earth revolves around the Sun, approximate axial parallelism of the Moon's orbital plane (tilted five degrees to the Earth's orbital plane) results in the revolution of the lunar nodes relative to the Earth. This causes an eclipse season approximately every six months, in which a solar eclipse can occur at the new moon phase and a lunar eclipse can occur at the full moon phase.

The lunar phase depends on the Moon's position in orbit around the Earth and the Earth's position in orbit around the Sun. This animation (not to scale) looks down on Earth from the north pole of the ecliptic.

It might be expected that once every month, when the Moon passes between Earth and the Sun during a new moon, its shadow would fall on Earth causing a solar eclipse, but this does not happen every month. Nor is it true that during every full moon, the Earth's shadow falls on the Moon, causing a lunar eclipse. Solar and lunar eclipses are not observed every month because the plane of the Moon's orbit around the Earth is tilted by about 5° with respect to the plane of Earth's orbit around the Sun (the plane of the ecliptic). Thus, when new and full moons occur, the Moon usually lies to the north or south of a direct line through the Earth and Sun.

Although an eclipse can only occur when the Moon is either new (solar) or full (lunar), it must also be positioned very near the intersection of Earth's orbital plane about the Sun and the Moon's orbital plane about the Earth (that is, at one of its nodes). This happens about twice per year, and so there are between four and seven eclipses in a calendar year. Most of these eclipses are partial; total eclipses of the Moon or Sun are less frequent.

=== Mechanism ===
The phases are not caused by the Earth's shadow falling on the Moon, as some people believe. They are caused by the Moon's shadow on itself, just as the Earth's shadow makes it night on one side of the Earth. The angle of the Sun in relation to the Moon determines how much of the Moon is illuminated.

== See also ==
- Blue moon – Astronomical phenomenon
- Earth phase – Phases of Earth as seen from the Moon
- Lunar effect – Unproven proposal of influence of lunar cycle on terrestrial creatures
- Lunar month – Time between successive new moons. (Also known as a "lunation".)
- Lunar observation – Methods and instruments used to observe the Moon
- Planetary phase – Part of planet seen to reflect sunlight
- Planetshine – Illumination by reflected sunlight from a planet
- Tide – Change in sea level due to gravity
- Week – Time unit equal to seven days
- Month – Unit of time, usually 28 to 31 days
- Parmenides – 5th-century BC Greek philosopher, who tried to explain lunar phases
