= Ashen light =

Supposed glow in Venus's light

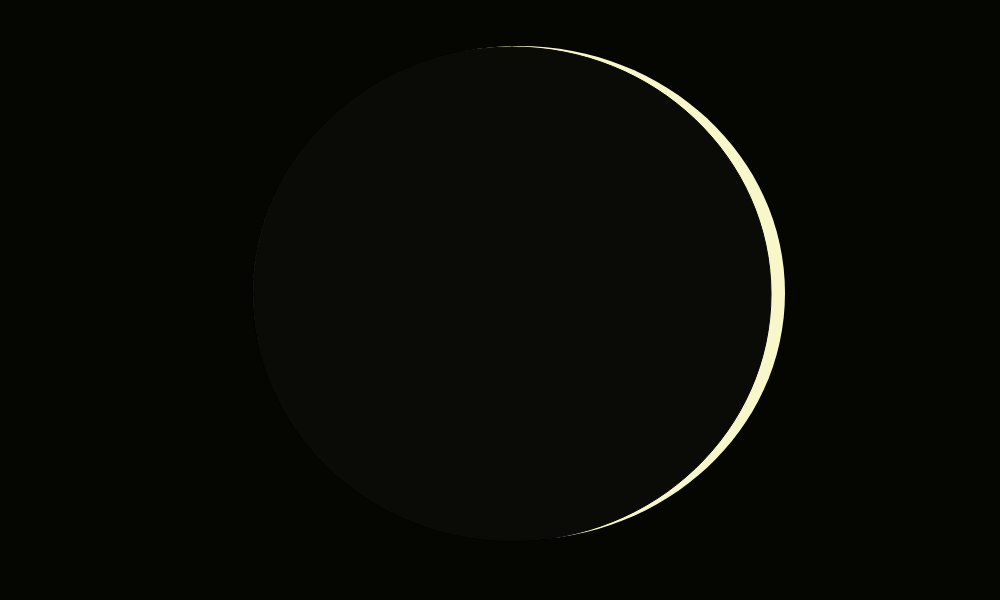
Artist's impression of ashen light

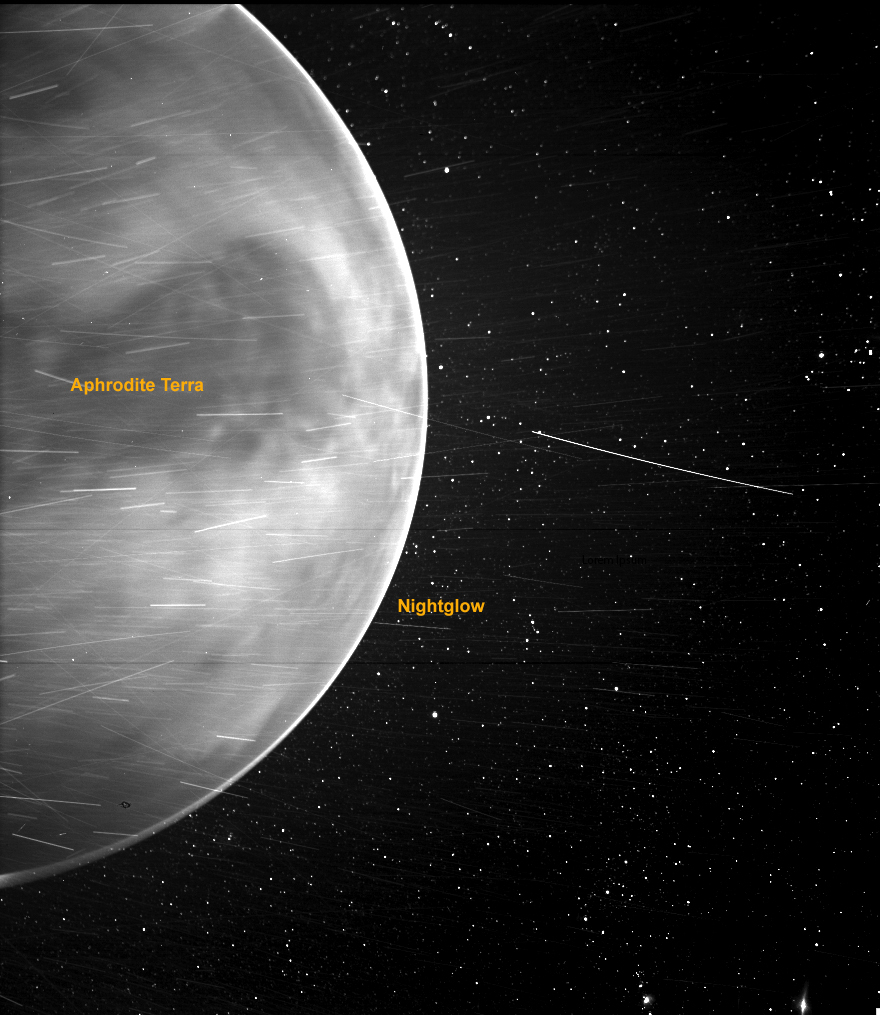
Nightglow is since 2022 considered the most likely candidate for the ashen light, visible as bright line along the limb of Venus in this visible light near-infrared image. The surface and its features, like the visible Ovda Regio plateau of Aphrodite Terra as the dark patch, is much less discernible by the human eye, though some people reporting ashen light might be seeing the surface due to higher sensitivity in the spectrum that the surface glows.

Ashen light is a subtle glow that has been claimed to be seen on the night side of the planet Venus. The phenomenon has not been scientifically confirmed, and theories as to the observed phenomenon's cause are numerous, such as emission of light by Venus, or optical phenomena within the observing telescope itself. A modern hypothesis as to the source of light on Venus suggests it to be associated with lightning, for which there is some evidence on Venus. This theory has fallen out of favour, however, as there is not enough light generated by this lightning so as to be observed. A more recent hypothesis is that it is a form of transient aurorae or airglow caused by unusually high solar activity interacting with the upper Venusian atmosphere.

== History of observations ==
While the discovery of the ashen light is often attributed to Italian astronomer Giovanni Battista Riccioli, recent evidence finds that German priest Athanasius Kircher might have been the first to observe the ashen light during his one and only trip to Palermo, Sicily in the spring of 1638. However, the first distinct and detailed record of the ashen light was produced by Riccioli on 9 January 1643, who ascribed it to the refraction of light within the telescope itself: "The colours arise from the various refraction of light in the glass, as it happens with trigonal glasses." This is likely a description of a phenomenon now known as chromatic aberration. Subsequent claims have been made by various observers ever since, including Sir William Herschel, Sir Patrick Moore, Dale P. Cruikshank, and William K. Hartmann.

By the late 19th century the light phenomenon was described by those who stated they had observed it as ash-coloured, reminiscent of earthlight, therefore being called Venusian lumière cendrée or in English ashen light.

The ashen light has often been sighted when Venus is in the evening sky, when the evening terminator of the planet is toward the Earth. Observation attempts were made on 17 July 2001, when a 67% illuminated Venus reappeared from behind a 13% illuminated moon. None of the observers of this occurrence (including some using 61 cm (24 in) 'Super RADOTS' telescopes) reported seeing the ashen light. Video from the event was captured, but the camera was too insensitive to detect even the earthshine.

A particularly favourable viewing opportunity occurred on 8 October 2015, with a 40% illuminated Venus reappearing from behind the unlit limb of a 15% sunlit Moon. The event was visible in dark skies throughout Central Australia and was recorded by David and Joan Dunham (of the International Occultation Timing Association) using a 10" f/4 Newton telescope with a Watec 120N+ video camera from a location just north of Alice Springs. They also observed the event visually with an 8" Schmidt–Cassegrain telescope. Neither the real-time visual observation nor close visual inspection of the video recording showed any sign of the night side of Venus.

== Light source hypotheses ==
The Keck telescope on Hawaii reported seeing a subtle green glow and suggested it could be produced as ultraviolet light from the Sun splits molecules of carbon dioxide (CO_{2}), known to be common in Venus's atmosphere, into carbon monoxide (CO) and oxygen (O_{2}). However, the green light emitted as oxygen recombines to form O_{2} is thought too faint to explain the effect, and it is too faint to have been observed with amateur telescopes.

In 1967, Venera 4 found the Venusian magnetic field to be much weaker than that of Earth. This magnetic field is induced by an interaction between the ionosphere and the solar wind, rather than by an internal dynamo in the core like the one inside Earth. Venus's small induced magnetosphere provides negligible protection to the atmosphere against cosmic radiation. This radiation may result in cloud-to-cloud lightning discharges.

It was hypothesised in 1957 by Urey and Brewer that CO^{+}, CO^{+}_{2} and O^{−}_{2} ions produced by the ultraviolet radiation from the Sun were the cause of the glow. In 1969, it was hypothesised that the Ashen light is an auroral phenomena due to solar particle bombardment on the dark side of Venus.

Throughout the 1980s, it was thought that the cause of the glow was lightning on Venus. The Soviet Venera 9 and 10 orbital probes obtained optical and electromagnetic evidence of lightning on Venus. Also, the Pioneer Venus Orbiter recorded visible airglow at Venus in 1978 strong enough to saturate its star sensor. In 1990, Christopher T. Russell and J. L. Phillips gave further support to the lightning hypothesis, stating that if there are several strikes on the night side of the planet, in a sufficiently short period of time, the sequence may give off an overall glow in the skies of Venus. The European Space Agency's Venus Express in 2007 detected whistler waves, providing further evidence for lightning on Venus.

The Akatsuki spacecraft, by Japan's space agency JAXA, entered orbit around Venus on 7 December 2015. Part of its scientific payload includes the Lightning and Airglow Camera (LAC) which is looking for lightning in the visible spectrum (552–777 nm). To image lightning, the orbiter has sight of the dark side of Venus for about 30 minutes every 10 days. No lightning has been detected in 16.8 hours of night-side observation (July 2019).

Simulations indicate that the lightning hypothesis as the cause of the glow is incorrect, as not enough light could be transmitted through the atmosphere to be seen from Earth. Observers have speculated it may be illusory, resulting from the physiological effect of observing a bright, crescent-shaped object. Spacecraft looking for it have not been able to spot it — leading some astronomers to believe that it is just an enduring myth.

A more recent hypothesis is that unusually high solar activity could induce auroral or airglow-like effects on the dark side of Venus. It has been observed that after major solar storms, an emission of light with a wavelength of 557.7 nm (the oxygen green line) occurs across the entire upper atmosphere of Venus. This is the same phenomenon which gives some aurorae on Earth their greenish appearance. Generally, this emission does not occur except for during major solar events such as coronal mass ejections (CMEs) or solar flares. However, dim emissions have been detected twice outside of solar storms, on December 27, 2010, and December 12, 2013 respectively. Both of these detections coincided with the passage of a "Stream Interaction Region", a denser than average solar wind. In July 2012, a CME struck Venus producing a very bright green line emission. It is notable that after every CME impact on Venus, this emission is detected, but not after every flare. This is taken to indicate charged particles are what is responsible for the green line emission, similar to Earth's aurora.

WISPR of the Parker Solar Probe took this visible light footage of the nightside in 2021, showing the hot faintly glowing surface, and its Ovda Regio plateau of Aphrodite Terra as large dark patch, through the clouds, which prohibit such observations on the dayside when they are illuminated.

Images of the night side of Venus in visible light, by the WISPR instrument of the Parker Solar Probe, have shown in 2022 that the surface is visible through the clouds at the night side. The study of the data though points at nightglow, also observed in visible light, as the more likely candidate for the ashen light. Human eyes are less sensitive to the visible light near-infrared red glow from the surface, which also mostly obscured by the clouds, but if this light is an ashen light, then it might have been reported by people with eyesight more sensitive to the red spectrum.

== See also ==
- Atmosphere of Venus
