= Earthlight =

Light reflected from the Earth

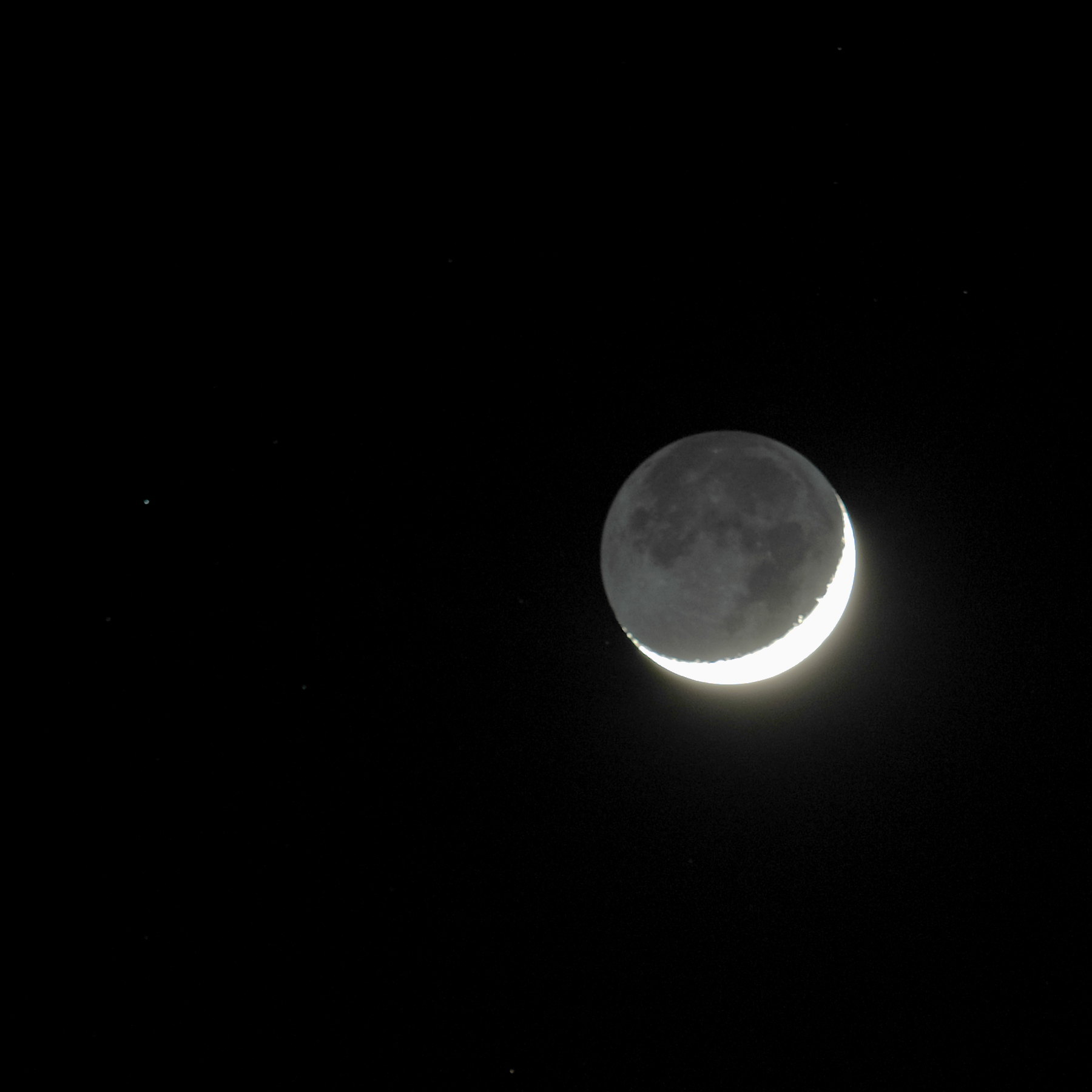
The night side of the Moon, illuminated by earthshine, becomes visible next to the narrow crescent (11 percent, age of the Moon = 3.3 days) with ash-grey moonlight.

Earthlight is the diffuse reflection of sunlight reflected from Earth's surface and clouds. Earthshine (an example of planetshine) causes the Moon's ashen light, the dim illumination of the otherwise unilluminated portion of the Moon by this indirect sunlight.

Earthlight on the Moon during the waxing crescent is sometimes called "the old Moon in the new Moon's arms", while that during the waning crescent is called "the new Moon in the old Moon's arms".

== Visibility ==
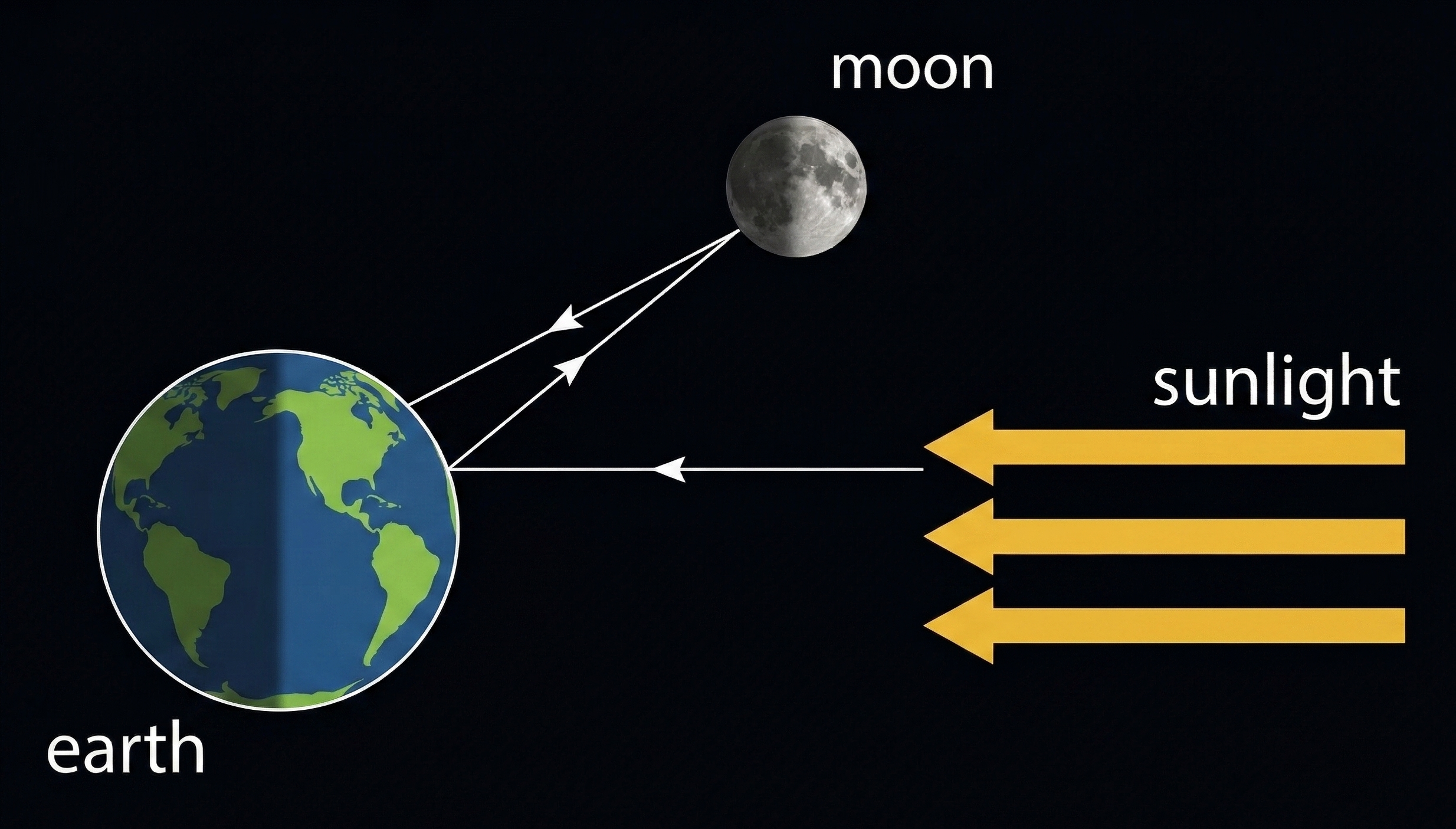
Diagram of the path of sunlight rays.

=== At Earth ===
Earthlight has a calculated maximum apparent magnitude of −17.7 as viewed from the Moon. When the Earth is at maximum phase, the total radiance at the lunar surface is approximately 0.15 W m^{−2} from Earthlight. This is only 0.01% of the radiance from direct Sunlight. Earthshine has a calculated maximum apparent magnitude of −3.69 as viewed from Earth.

This phenomenon is most visible from Earth at night (or astronomical twilight) a few days before or after the day of new moon, when the lunar phase is a thin crescent. On these nights, the entire lunar disk is both directly and indirectly sunlit, and is thus unevenly bright enough to see. Earthshine is most clearly seen after dusk during the waxing crescent (in the western sky) and before dawn during the waning crescent (in the eastern sky).

High contrast photography is also able to reveal the night side of the Moon illuminated by Earthlight during a solar eclipse.

Radio frequency transmissions are also reflected by the Moon; for example, see Earth–Moon–Earth communication.

=== At the Moon ===
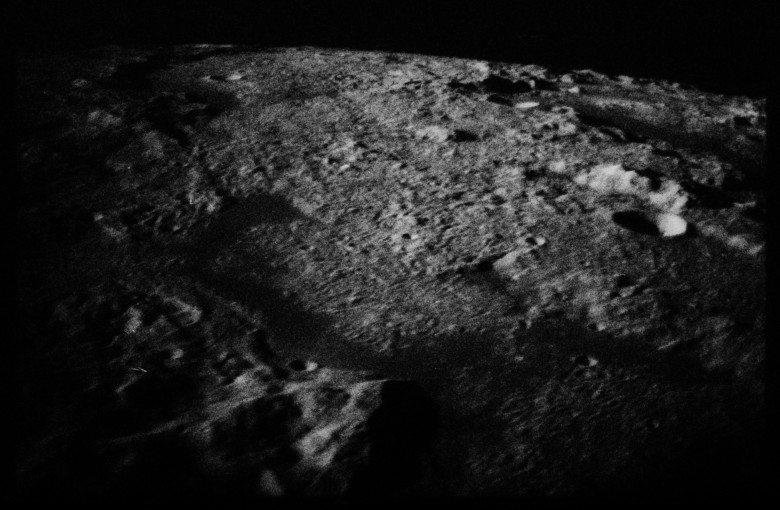
An oblique, black-and-white view of a portion of Mare Orientale from the CSM Apollo 17, illustrating the illuminating effect of Earthlight on the lunar terrain below during local nighttime; Evans reported seeing a light "flash" apparently originating from the surface in this area.

The term earthlight would also be suitable for an observer on the Moon seeing Earth during the lunar night, or for an astronaut inside a spacecraft looking out the window. Arthur C. Clarke uses it in this sense in his 1955 novel Earthlight. During the Apollo 11 lunar mission while the spacecraft was approaching lunar orbit at a distance of 19,000 kilometres on 19 July 1969, astronaut Michael Collins reported, "The Earthshine coming through the window is so bright you can read a book by it."

No person has been on the Moon during its night time to experience earthshine from the surface. Earthshine during lunar night is about 43 times brighter, and sometimes even 55 times brighter, than a night on Earth illuminated by the light of the full moon. Only on the far side and during lunar eclipses on the near side does the night become dark (and darker than a moonless night on Earth).

When the first astronauts travelled out to the Moon during the Apollo 8 mission and flew into the shadow behind it on 24 December 1968, the darkness of the unlit side was so profound that the Moon was invisible to the crew, in orbit around it, who could only detect a black circular silhouette surrounded by millions of stars not normally visible on Earth. Bill Anders later described how he only became aware of the Moon when he noticed the "big black void...as black as I've ever seen black" blocking the tapestry of stars more spectacular in number and dazzling in brilliance than can be seen beneath the Earth's atmosphere. "That was the only time in the flight the hair kind of came up on the back of my neck a little bit" said Anders.

Operations on the Moon and remote studying of the Moon and Earth is enabled by earthlight, and has been used for research, for example to study Earth's environment by studying the amount of earthlight it produces. Earthlight allows also some places on the surface of the lunar near side to be illuminated that are never illuminated by the Sun.

== History ==
The phenomenon was sketched and remarked upon in the 16th century by Leonardo da Vinci, who thought that the illumination came from reflections from the Earth's oceans (we now know that clouds account for much more reflected intensity than the oceans). This is why this phenomenon is sometimes called the Da Vinci Glow.

It is referenced in "The Ballad of Sir Patrick Spens" (Child Ballad No. 58), in the phrase "'A saw the new muin late yestreen/ Wi the auld muin in her airm."

Astronaut Dr Sian Proctor was moved by seeing and experiencing earthlight from orbit as mission pilot of Inspiration4 space mission and wrote the poem, "Earthlight". In 2024, Proctor authored EarthLight: The Power of EarthLight and the Human Perspective on the concept and nature of earthlight.

== See also ==
- List of light sources
- Moonlight
- Sunlight
- Starlight
