= Sky brightness =

Visual perception of the sky and how it scatters and diffuses light

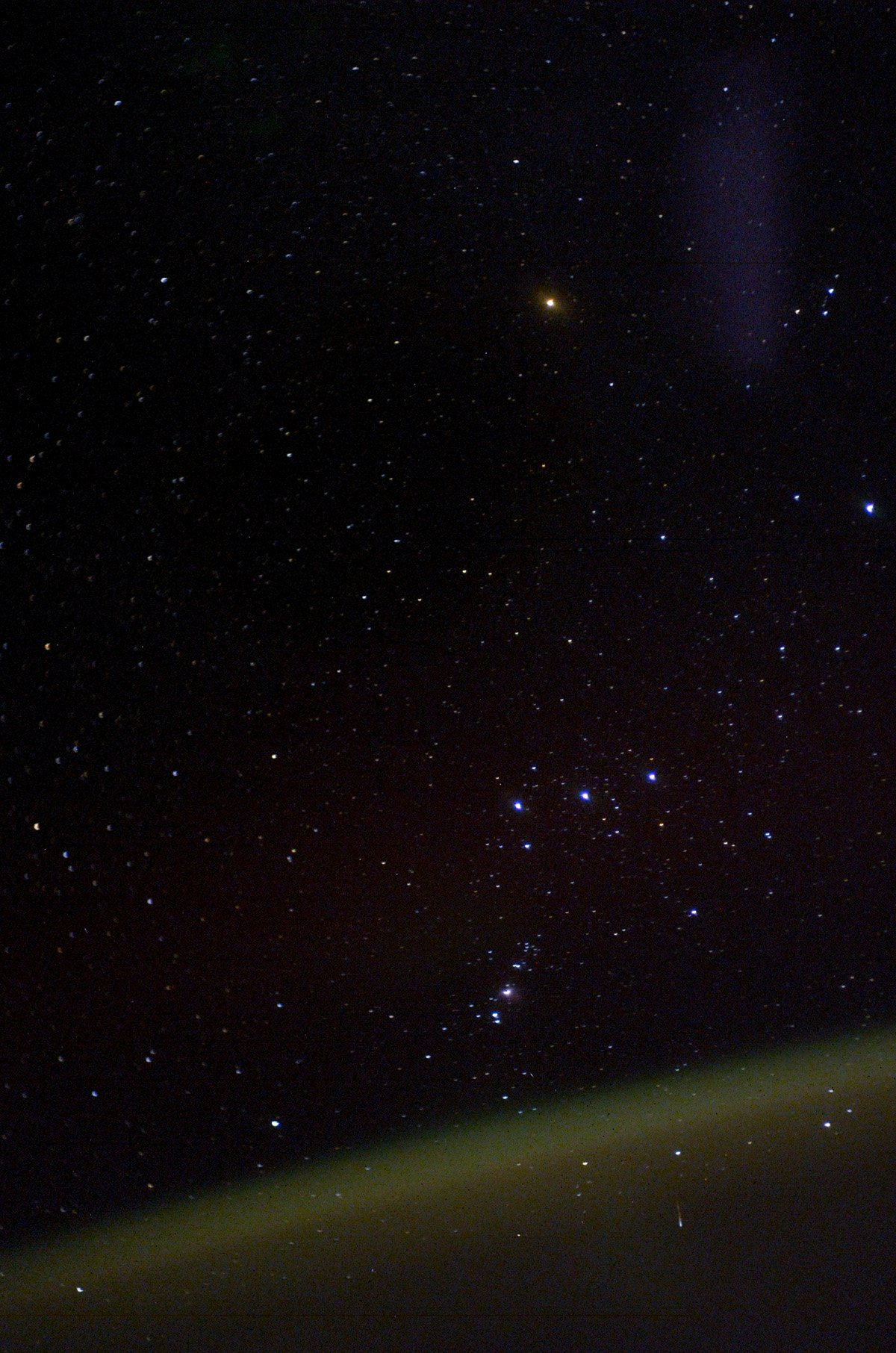
Airglow made visible from aboard the ISS

Sky brightness refers to the visual perception of the sky and how it scatters and diffuses light. The fact that the sky is not completely dark at night is easily visible. If light sources (e.g. the Moon and light pollution) were removed from the night sky, only direct starlight would be visible.

The sky's brightness varies greatly over the day, and the primary cause differs as well. During daytime, when the Sun is above the horizon, the direct scattering of sunlight is the overwhelmingly dominant source of light. During twilight (the duration after sunset or before sunrise until or since, respectively, the full darkness of night), the situation is more complicated, and a further differentiation is required.

Twilight (both dusk and dawn) is divided into three 6° segments that mark the Sun's position below the horizon. At civil twilight, the center of the Sun's disk appears to be between 1/4° and 6° below the horizon. At nautical twilight, the Sun's altitude is between –6° and –12°. At astronomical twilight, the Sun is between –12° and –18°. When the Sun's depth is more than 18°, the sky generally attains its maximum darkness.

Sources of the night sky's intrinsic brightness include airglow, indirect scattering of sunlight, scattering of starlight, and light pollution.

== Airglow ==
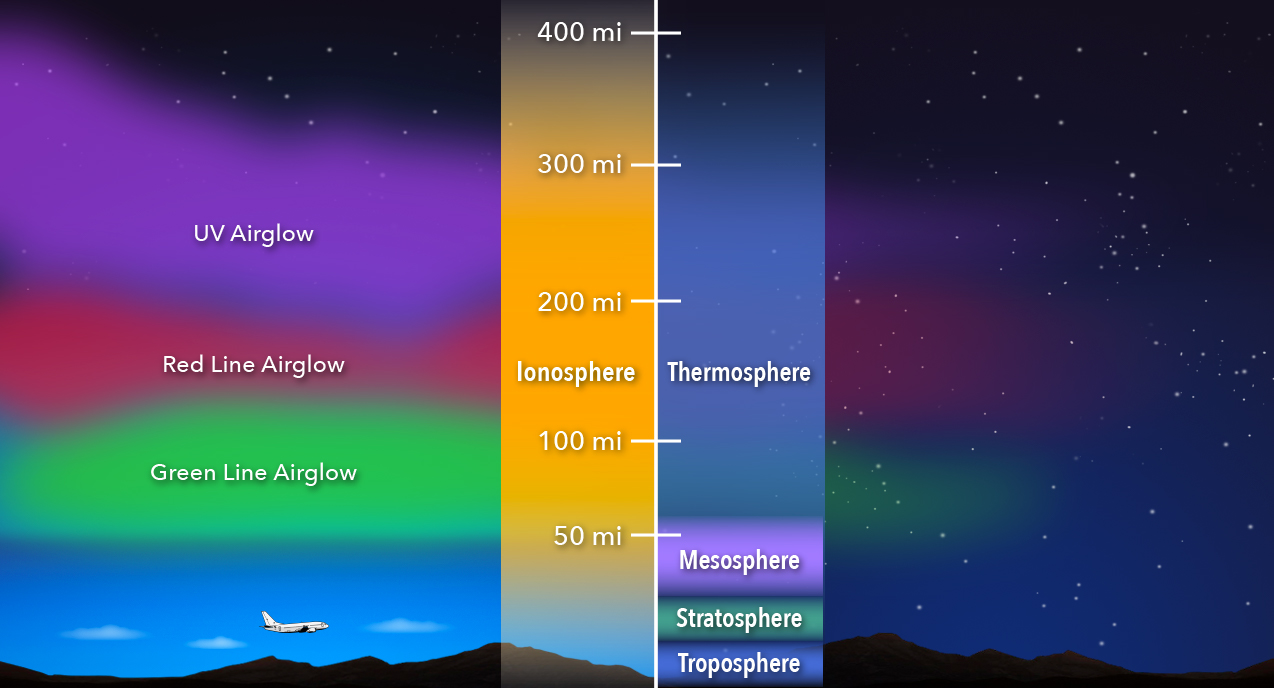
Airglow contributions from different layers of the atmosphere

When physicist Anders Ångström examined the spectrum of the aurora borealis in 1868, he discovered that even on nights when the aurora was absent, its characteristic green line was still present. It was not until the 1920s that scientists were beginning to identify and understand the emission lines in aurorae and of the sky itself, and what was causing them. The green line Angstrom observed is in fact an emission line with a wavelength of 557.76 nm, caused by the recombination of oxygen in the upper atmosphere.

Airglow is the collective name of the various processes in the upper atmosphere that result in the emission of photons, with the driving force being primarily UV radiation from the Sun. It is about a tenth as bright as the collective glow of starlight, requiring clear, dark skies to photograph. Several emission lines are dominant: a green line from oxygen at 557.7 nm, a yellow doublet from sodium at 589.0 and 589.6 nm, red lines from oxygen at 630.0 and 636.4 nm, and various hydroxyl bands.

The sodium emissions come from a sporadic sodium layer approximately 10 km thick at an altitude of 90–100 km, above the mesopause and in the D-layer of the ionosphere. How sodium gets to mesospheric heights is not yet well understood, but it is believed to be mainly from meteor ablation. The red oxygen lines originate at altitudes of about 250 km, in the F-layer. The green oxygen emissions are more spatially distributed, with peaks in the upper mesosphere and lower thermosphere.

In daytime, sodium and red oxygen emissions are dominant and roughly 1,000 times as bright as nighttime emissions because in daytime, the upper atmosphere is fully exposed to solar UV radiation. However, the effect is not noticeable to the human eye, since the glare of directly scattered sunlight outshines and obscures it.

== Indirect scattering of sunlight ==
Amount of air still illuminated after sunset, at the horizon. Normalized so that zenith is 1 airmass

Indirectly scattered sunlight comes from two sources: from the atmosphere itself, and from outer space. In the first case, after the Sun has just set it still directly illuminates the upper atmosphere. The amount of scattered sunlight is proportional to the number of scatterers (i.e. air molecules and aerosols) in the line of sight, which increases as the altitude of the Sun approaches the horizon. This attenuation of sunlight is described by the Beer–Lambert law.

The intensity of the scattered twilight decreases as the Sun drops further below the horizon and illuminates less of the atmosphere. When the Sun's altitude is below −6°, 99% of the atmosphere in the zenith direction is in the Earth's shadow and second order scattering takes over. However, at the horizon in the direction of sunset, 35% of the atmosphere along the line of sight is still directly illuminated, and continues to be until the sun reaches −12°. From −12° to −18° only the uppermost parts of the atmosphere along the horizon, directly above the spot where the Sun descended, is still illuminated. After that, all direct illumination ceases and astronomical darkness sets in.

A second source of sunlight is the zodiacal light, which is caused by reflection and scattering of sunlight by interplanetary dust. Zodiacal light varies in intensity depending on the position of the Earth, location of the observer, time of year, and composition and distribution of the reflecting dust.

== Scattered light from extraterrestrial sources ==
Not only sunlight is scattered by the molecules in the air. Starlight and the diffuse light of the Milky Way are also scattered by the air, and it is found that stars up to V magnitude 16 contribute to the diffuse scattered starlight. Other sources such as galaxies and nebulae don't contribute significantly.

The total brightness of all the stars was first measured by Burns in 1899, with a calculated result that the total brightness reaching earth was equivalent to that of 2,000 first-magnitude stars, with subsequent measurements by others.

== Light pollution ==
Light pollution is an ever-increasing source of sky brightness in urbanized areas. As of 2023, it is estimated to be increasing at the rate of 9.6% per year. In densely populated areas that do not have stringent light pollution control, the entire night sky is regularly 5 to 50 times brighter than it would be if all lights were switched off, and very often the influence of light pollution is far greater than natural sources (including moonlight). With urbanization and light pollution, one third of humanity, and the majority of those in developed countries, cannot see the Milky Way.

== Twilight ==
When the Sun has just set, the brightness of the sky decreases rapidly, thereby enabling the viewing of the airglow that is caused from such high altitudes that they are still fully sunlit until the Sun drops more than about 12° below the horizon. During this time, yellow emissions from the sodium layer and red emissions from the 630 nm oxygen lines are dominant, and contribute to the purplish color sometimes seen during civil and nautical twilight.

After the Sun has also set for these altitudes at the end of nautical twilight, the intensity of light emanating from earlier mentioned lines decreases, until the oxygen-green remains as the dominant source.

When astronomical darkness has set in, the green 557.7 nm oxygen line is dominant, and atmospheric scattering of starlight occurs.

Differential refraction causes different parts of the spectrum to dominate, producing a golden hour and a blue hour.

== Relative contributions ==
The following table gives the relative and absolute contributions to night sky brightness at zenith on a perfectly dark night at middle latitudes without moonlight and in the absence of any light pollution.

Night sky brightness
Cause	Surface brightness [S_{10}]	Percentage
Airglow	145	65
Zodiacal light	60	27
Scattered starlight	~15	7

(The S_{10} unit is defined as the surface brightness of a star whose V-magnitude is 10 and whose light is smeared over one square degree, or 27.78 mag arcsec^{−2}.)

The total sky brightness in zenith is therefore ~220 S_{10} or 21.9 mag/arcsec² in the V-band. Note that the contributions from Airglow and Zodiacal light vary with the time of year, the solar cycle, and the observer's latitude roughly as follows:

$${\rm Airglow}/{\rm S}_{10} = 145+108(S-0.8)$$

where S is the solar 10.7 cm flux in MJy, and various sinusoidally between 0.8 and 2.0 with the 11-year solar cycle, yielding an upper contribution of ~270 S_{10} at solar maximum.

The intensity of zodiacal light depends on the ecliptic latitude and longitude of the point in the sky being observed relative to that of the Sun. At ecliptic longitudes differing from the Sun's by > 90 degrees, the relation is

$${\rm ZodiacalLight}/{\rm S}_{10} = 140 - 90\sin(|\beta|)$$

where β is the ecliptic latitude and is smaller than 60°, when larger than 60 degrees the contribution is that given in the table. Along the ecliptic plane there are enhancements in the zodiacal light where it is much brighter near the Sun and with a secondary maximum opposite the Sun at 180 degrees longitude (the gegenschein).

In extreme cases natural zenith sky brightness can be as high as ~21.0 mag/arcsec², roughly twice as bright as nominal conditions.

== See also ==
- Night sky
- Airglow
- Zodiacal light
- Light pollution
- Skyglow
- Sky quality meter
