= SQM =

SQM or sqm may refer to:

== Science and technology ==
- Square metre (sqm), a unit of area
- Sky quality meter, an instrument for measuring the luminance of the night sky
- Supersymmetric quantum mechanics, in theoretical physics

=== Computing ===
- Software quality management, a management process
- Smart Queue Management, a technique in computer network active queue management

== Other uses ==
- Sociedad Química y Minera, a Chilean mining and chemical company
- São Miguel do Araguaia (IATA code), an airport in Brazil
