= Sky quality meter =

Instrument used to measure the luminance of the night sky

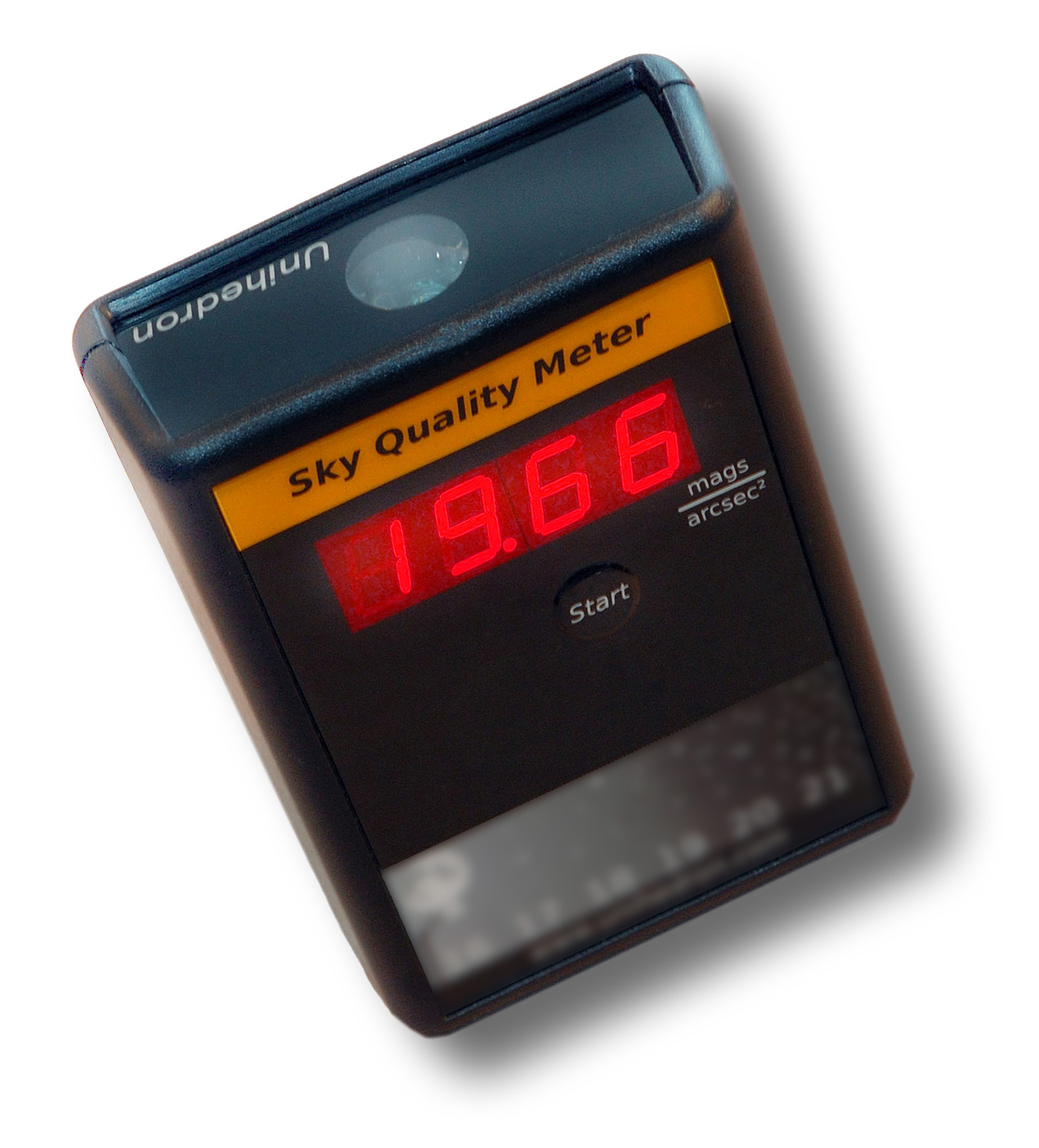
Sky Quality Meter model SQM-L

A sky quality meter (SQM) is an instrument used to measure the luminance of the night sky, more specifically the Night Sky Brightness (NSB) at the zenith, with a bandwidth ranging from 390 nm to 600 nm. It is used, typically by amateur astronomers, to quantify the skyglow aspect of light pollution and uses units of "magnitudes per square arcsecond" favoured by astronomers.

== Structure and design ==
The SQM is equipped with a silicon photodiode functioning as detector which is partially covered by a rejection filter for the near-infrared wavelength. The system has a high response to wavelengths up to the near-infrared (from 350 nm to 2500 nm), thanks to a converter from light to frequency. This structure tries to mimic the human eye spectral response under the photopic regime.

A final spectral response is provided by the combination of the photodiode and the transmission near-infrared cut-off filter. This response overlaps the Johnson B and V bands, well known in astronomical photometry, in the wavelength range between 320 nm and 720 nm, which includes visible light spectrum.

Beyond amateur astronomers, the SQM photometers have become very popular among researchers from different fields of study, including associations involved in fighting light pollution. The instrument has a systematic uncertainty which is quoted of 10% (0.1 mag arcsec−2). The aspect of uncertainty is also related to the stability of these radiometers: the variation of the instrument behaviour (mainly due to sensor ageing, the influence of the air temperature and atmospheric conditions and internal temperature) could be confused with changes of the sky brightness, especially when NSB tracking is performed over a long time interval.

== Models and production ==
There are several models of SQM made, offering different fields of view (i.e. measuring different angular areas on the sky), and various automatic measurement and data logging or data communication capabilities. The current versions has only one band of observation, that can produce misinterpretations if the light pollution changes from sodium-vapor lamp to LED.

The SQM-L, or "Sky Quality Meter - L," is a model with an additional integrated lens, offering a narrower measurement range of 20° compared to the 84° range of the standard SQM model.

The SQM is produced by the Canadian company Unihedron in Grimsby, Ontario.

== Scale ==
=== SQM scale ===
The values reported by the SQM are in units of magnitudes per square arcsecond (mag arcsec^{−2}).

Typically, the data provided by SQMs are recorded in magnitudes, denoted as m or mag, specifically in mSQM (or magSQM), where the subscript SQM indicates that the measured radiance is calculated by weighting the electromagnetic radiation according to the spectral responsivity of these instruments.

As astronomical magnitudes are a negative logarithmic scale, smaller values indicate a brighter sky and a difference of 5 mag arcsec^{−2} corresponds to a difference in luminance of 100 times. Typical values will range between around 16 for bright urban skies to 22 for the darkest skies on Earth.

=== Light Pollution Index ===
The Light Pollution Index (LPI), used in David J. Lorenz's light pollution atlas, is a ratio comparing artificial sky brightness with natural sky brightness. The LPI scale is used as a complement to the SQM scale. For example, if artificial brightness is proportionally the same as natural brightness, the LPI score would be 1.0, which is equivalent to an SQM score of 21.25. A LPI score of less than 1.0 means that zodiacal light, the Milky Way, starlight, and other natural sources contribute more to sky brightness than artificial sources do, whereas an LPI score measuring more than 1.0 means that artificial sources contribute more to sky brightness.

The following table compares SQM values (in magnitudes per square arcsecond) to LPI values (ratios of artificial sky brightness to natural sky brightness). Since SQM values are logarithmic, LPI scores increase exponentially as SQM values decrease linearly. Theoretically, the darkest possible night sky is given an SQM value of 22.0, which would correspond to a Light Pollution Index value of 0.

Comparison of LPI and SQM ranges
Light Pollution Index	SQM (mag/arcsec²)
< 0.01	22.00 – 21.99
0.01 – 0.06	21.99 – 21.93
0.06 – 0.11	21.93 – 21.89
0.11 – 0.19	21.89 – 21.81
0.19 – 0.33	21.81 – 21.69
0.33 – 0.58	21.69 – 21.51
0.58 – 1.00	21.51 – 21.25
1.00 – 1.73	21.25 – 20.91
1.73 – 3.00	20.91 – 20.49
3.00 – 5.20	20.49 – 20.02
5.20 – 9.00	20.02 – 19.50
9.00 – 15.59	19.50 – 18.95
15.59 – 27.00	18.95 – 18.38
27.00 – 46.77	18.38 – 17.80
> 46.77	< 17.80

Comparison of selected LPI and SQM values
Light Pollution Index	SQM (mag/arcsec²)
0	22
0.06	21.93
0.11	21.89
0.19	21.81
0.33	21.69
0.58	21.51
1	21.25
1.73	20.91
3	20.49
5.2	20.02
9	19.5
15.59	18.95
27	18.38
46.77	17.8

Some examples of Light Pollution Index values:

- 1: Typically considered to be the upper limit for truly dark skies
- 10: Often typical of exurbs and outer suburbs
- 50: Typical of downtown areas of large cities
- 250: Some of the highest recorded values, such as in Mecca, Saudi Arabia

== Limits and considerations ==
SQM response can be influenced by ambient temperature variations, so it is important to verify these effects. Since SQMs are not waterproof, they must be protected from moisture using a housing, which is generally provided by the manufacturer. This housing protects the device but also traps heat generated during operation, which is minimal for USB models (SQM-LU) but more significant for Ethernet models (SQM-LE).

In urban environments, SQMs frequently record large variations in radiance due to the presence or absence of clouds. Radiance measurements taken by SQM-LU devices are stable within the temperature range of −15 °C to 35 °C, with variations smaller than the 10% systematic uncertainty stated by the manufacturer.

When SQMs are installed permanently outdoors for long-term monitoring, their sensitivity can degrade over time due to environmental exposure. A 2021 study demonstrated that this ageing effect – caused by factors such as reduced sensor sensitivity and optical degradation – can lead to systematic darkening of measurements. The researchers proposed a correction method using twilight sky brightness as a natural calibration source. By comparing SQM readings under clear twilight conditions with empirical models, they derived linear degradation rates of 34-53 millimagnitudes/sqarcsec per year, depending on the location and latitude.

== Citizen science ==
SQM measurements can be submitted to a database on the manufacturer's website and to the citizen science project GLOBE at Night.

== See also ==
- Bortle scale
- Sky brightness
