= Night sky =

Appearance of the sky in a clear night

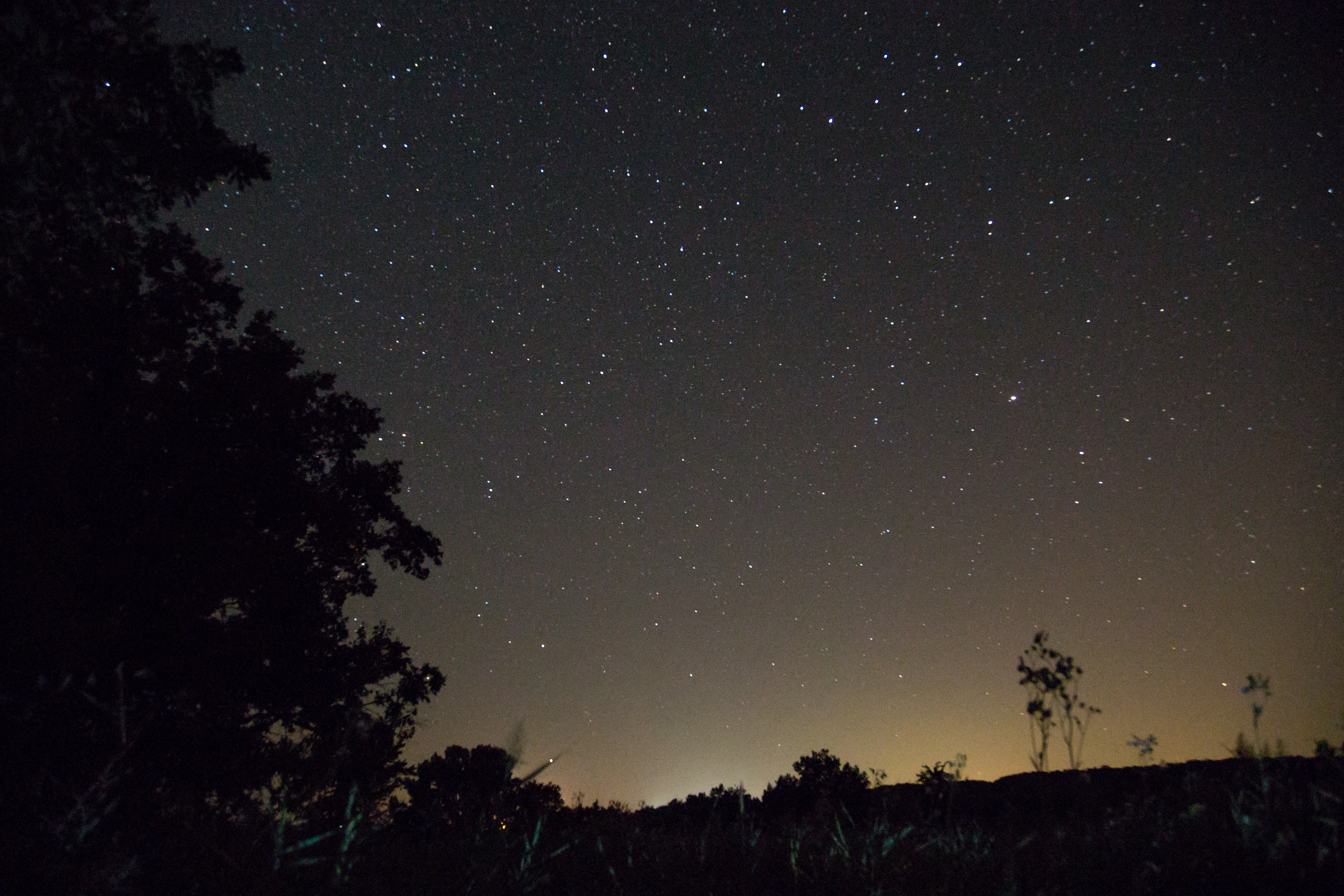
Stars in the night sky

The night sky is the nighttime appearance of celestial objects like stars, planets, and the Moon, which are visible in a clear sky between sunset and sunrise, when the Sun is below the horizon.

Natural light sources in a night sky include moonlight, starlight, and airglow, depending on location and timing. Aurorae light up the skies above the polar circles. Occasionally, a large coronal mass ejection from the Sun or simply high levels of solar wind may extend the phenomenon toward the Equator.

The night sky and studies of it have a historical place in both ancient and modern cultures. In the past, for instance, farmers have used the status of the night sky as a calendar to determine when to plant crops. Many cultures have drawn constellations between stars in the sky, using them in association with legends and mythology about their deities.

The history of astrology has generally been based on the belief that relationships between heavenly bodies influence or explain events on Earth. The scientific study of objects in the night sky takes place in the context of observational astronomy.

Visibility of celestial objects in the night sky is affected by light pollution. The presence of the Moon in the night sky has historically hindered astronomical observation by increasing the amount of sky brightness. With the advent of artificial light sources, however, light pollution has been a growing problem for viewing the night sky. Optical filters and modifications to light fixtures can help to alleviate this problem, but for optimal views, both professional and amateur astronomers seek locations far from urban skyglow.

== Brightness ==
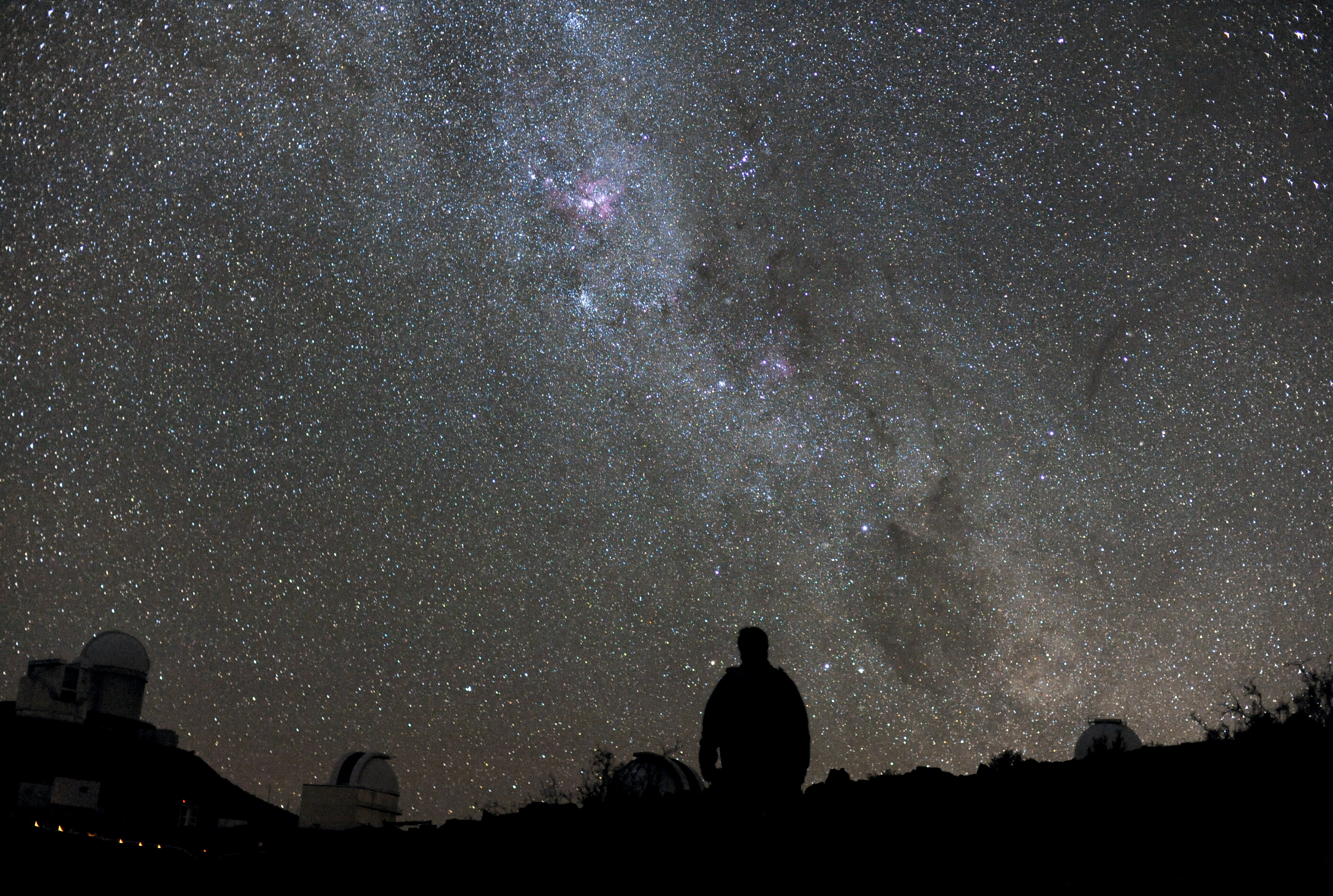
The Milky Way is brighter in the Southern Hemisphere than in the North. (Photo taken at La Silla Observatory)

The fact that the sky is not completely dark at night, even in the absence of moonlight and city lights, can be easily observed, since if the sky were absolutely dark, one would not be able to see the silhouette of an object against the sky.

The intensity of the sky brightness varies greatly over the day and the primary cause differs as well. During daytime when the Sun is above the horizon direct scattering of sunlight (Rayleigh scattering) is the overwhelmingly dominant source of light. In twilight, the period of time between sunset and sunrise, the situation is more complicated and a further differentiation is required. Twilight is divided in three segments according to how far the Sun is below the horizon in segments of 6°.

After sunset, civil twilight sets in and ends when the Sun drops more than 6° below the horizon. This is then followed by nautical twilight, when the Sun reaches heights of −6° and −12°, after which comes astronomical twilight defined as the period from −12° to −18°. When the Sun drops more than 18° below the horizon, the sky generally attains its minimum brightness.

Several sources can be identified as the source of the intrinsic brightness of the sky, namely airglow, indirect scattering of sunlight, scattering of starlight, and artificial light pollution.

== Visual presentation ==
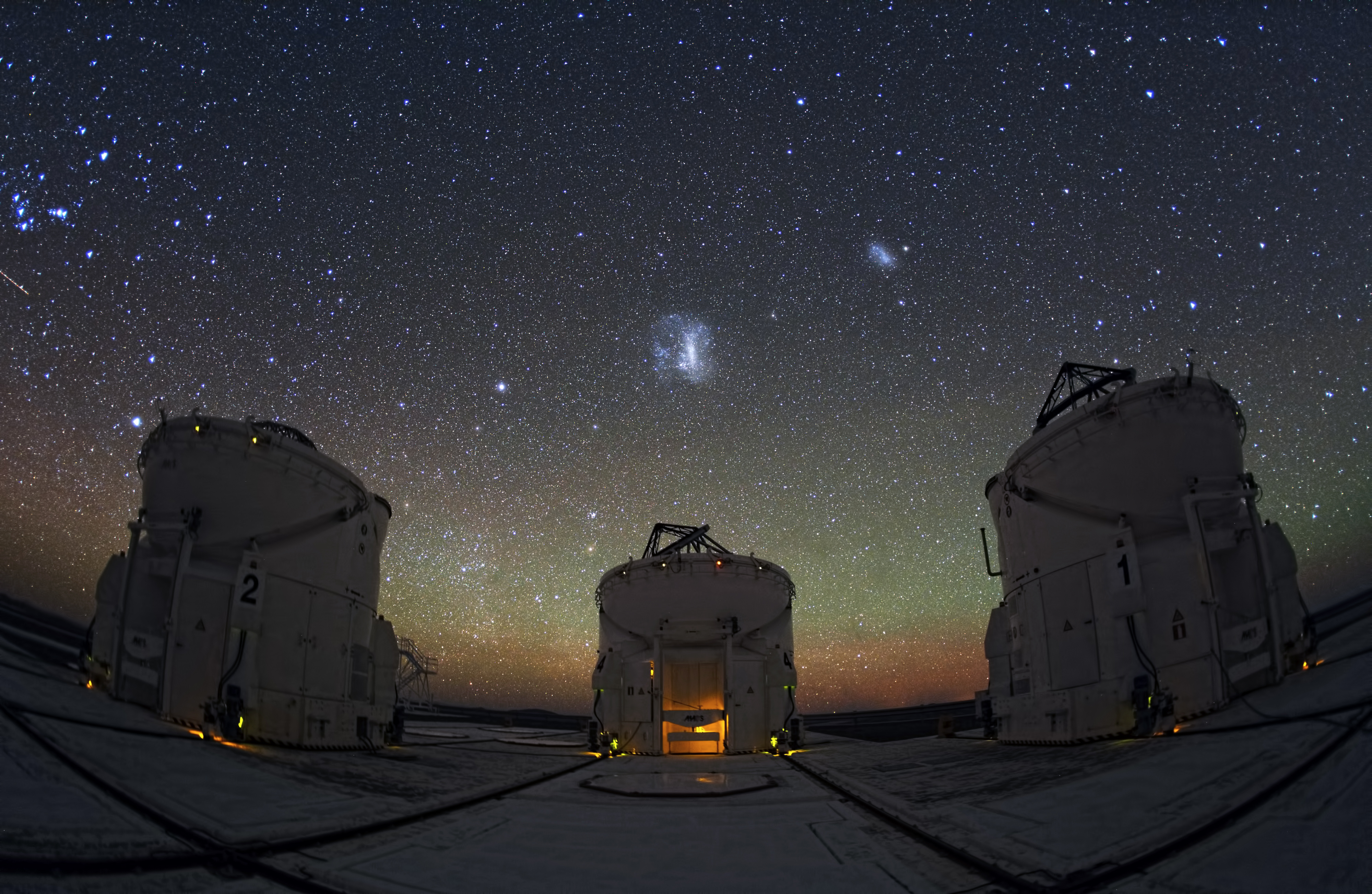
Paranal Observatory nights. The concept of noctcaelador tackles the aesthetic perception of the night sky.

Depending on local sky cloud cover, pollution, humidity, and light pollution levels, the stars visible to the unaided naked eye appear as hundreds, thousands or tens of thousands of white pinpoints of light in an otherwise near black sky together with some faint nebulae or clouds of light. In ancient times the stars were often assumed to be equidistant on a dome above the Earth because they are much too far away for stereopsis to offer any depth cues. Visible stars range in color from blue (hot) to red (cold), but with such small points of faint light, most look white because they stimulate the rod cells without triggering the cone cells. If it is particularly dark and a particularly faint celestial object is of interest, averted vision may be helpful.

The stars of the night sky cannot be counted unaided because they are so numerous and there is no way to track which have been counted and which have not. Further complicating the count, fainter stars may appear and disappear depending on exactly where the observer is looking. The result is an impression of an extraordinarily vast star field.

Because stargazing is best done from a dark place away from city lights, dark adaptation is important to achieve and maintain. It takes several minutes for eyes to adjust to the darkness necessary for seeing the most stars, and surroundings on the ground are hard to discern. A red flashlight can be used to illuminate star charts and telescope parts without undoing the dark adaptation.

Video of the night sky taken with DSLR cameras in Japan

=== Constellations ===
Star charts are produced to aid stargazers in identifying constellations and other celestial objects. Constellations are prominent because their stars tend to be brighter than other nearby stars in the sky. Different cultures have created different groupings of constellations based on differing interpretations of the more-or-less random patterns of dots in the sky. Constellations were identified without regard to distance to each star, but instead as if they were all dots on a dome.

Orion is among the most prominent and recognizable constellations. The Big Dipper (which has a wide variety of other names) is helpful for navigation in the northern hemisphere because it points to Polaris, the north star.

The pole stars are special because they are approximately in line with the Earth's axis of rotation so they appear to stay in one place while the other stars rotate around them through the course of a night (or a year).

=== Planets ===
Planets, named for the Greek word for 'wanderer', process through the starfield a little each day, executing loops with time scales dependent on the length of the planet's year or orbital period around the Sun. Planets, to the naked eye, appear as points of light in the sky with variable brightness. Planets shine due to sunlight reflecting or scattering from the planets' surface or atmosphere. Thus, the relative Sun-planet-Earth positions determine the planet's brightness. With a telescope or good binoculars, the planets appear as discs demonstrating finite size, and it is possible to observe orbiting moons which cast shadows onto the host planet's surface. Venus is the most prominent planet, often called the "morning star" or "evening star" because it is brighter than the stars and often the only "star" visible near sunrise or sunset, depending on its location in its orbit. Because of its brightness, Venus can sometimes be seen after sunrise. Mercury, Mars, Jupiter and Saturn are also visible to the naked eye in the night sky.

=== The Moon ===
The Moon appears as a grey disc in the sky with cratering visible to the naked eye. It spans, depending on its exact location, 29–33 arcminutes – which is about the size of a thumbnail at arm's length, and is readily identified. Over 29.53 days on average, the moon goes through a full cycle of lunar phases. People can generally identify phases within a few days by looking at the Moon. Unlike stars and most planets, the light reflected from the Moon is bright enough to be seen during the day.

Some of the most spectacular moons come during the full moon phase near sunset or sunrise. The Moon on the horizon benefits from the Moon illusion which makes it appear larger. The Sun's light reflected from the Moon traveling through the atmosphere also appears to color the Moon orange and/or red.

=== Comets ===
Comets come to the night sky only rarely. Comets are illuminated by the Sun, and their tails extend away from the Sun. A comet with a visible tail is quite unusual – a great comet appears about once a decade. They tend to be visible only shortly before sunrise or after sunset because those are the times they are close enough to the Sun to show a tail.

=== Clouds ===
Clouds obscure the view of other objects in the sky, though varying thicknesses of cloud cover have differing effects. A very thin cirrus cloud in front of the moon might produce a rainbow-colored ring around the moon. Stars and planets are too small or dim to take on this effect and are instead only dimmed (often to the point of invisibility). Thicker cloud cover obscures celestial objects entirely, making the sky black or reflecting city lights back down. Clouds are often close enough to afford some depth perception, though they are hard to see without moonlight or light pollution.

=== Other objects ===
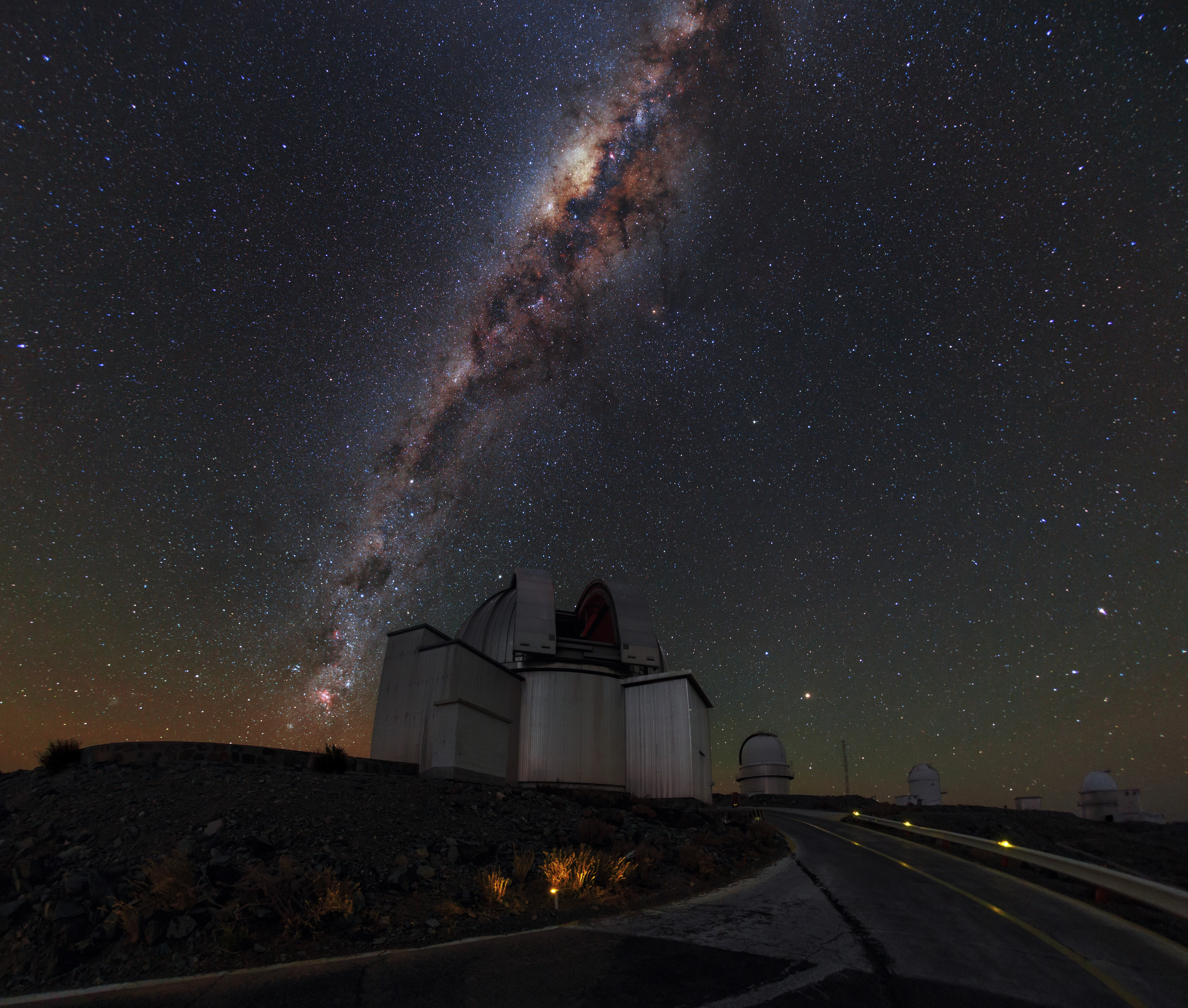
The Milky Way contains billions of stars, arranged in two strikingly different structures: halo and disc.

On clear dark nights in unpolluted areas, when the Moon appears thin or below the horizon, the Milky Way, a band of what looks like white dust, can be seen.

The Magellanic Clouds of the southern sky are easily mistaken to be Earth-based clouds (hence the name) but are in fact collections of stars found outside the Milky Way known as dwarf galaxies.

Zodiacal light is a glow that appears near the points where the Sun rises and sets, and is caused by sunlight interacting with interplanetary dust.

Gegenschein is a faint bright spot in the night sky centered at the antisolar point, caused by the backscatter of sunlight by interplanetary dust.

Shortly after sunset and before sunrise, artificial satellites often look like stars – similar in brightness and size – but move relatively quickly. Those that fly in low Earth orbit cross the sky in a couple of minutes. Some satellites, including space debris, appear to blink or have a periodic fluctuation in brightness because they are rotating. Satellite flares can appear brighter than Venus, with notable examples including the International Space Station (ISS) and Iridium Satellites.

Meteors streak across the sky infrequently. During a meteor shower, they may average one a minute at irregular intervals, but otherwise their appearance is a random surprise. The occasional meteor will make a bright, fleeting streak across the sky, and they can be very bright in comparison to the night sky.

Aircraft are also visible at night, distinguishable at a distance from other objects because their navigation lights blink.

== Sky map ==
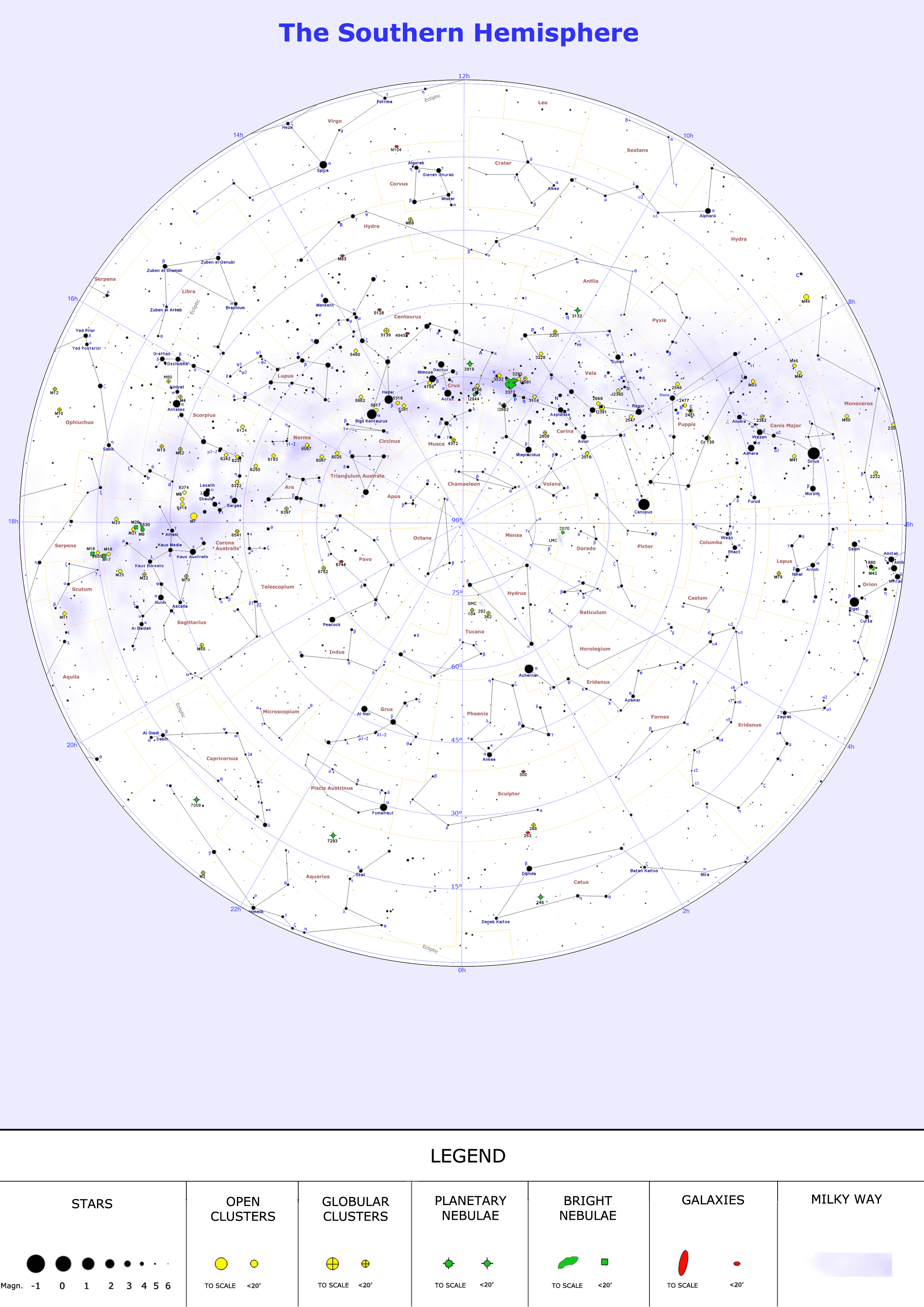
A Southern Hemisphere starchart.

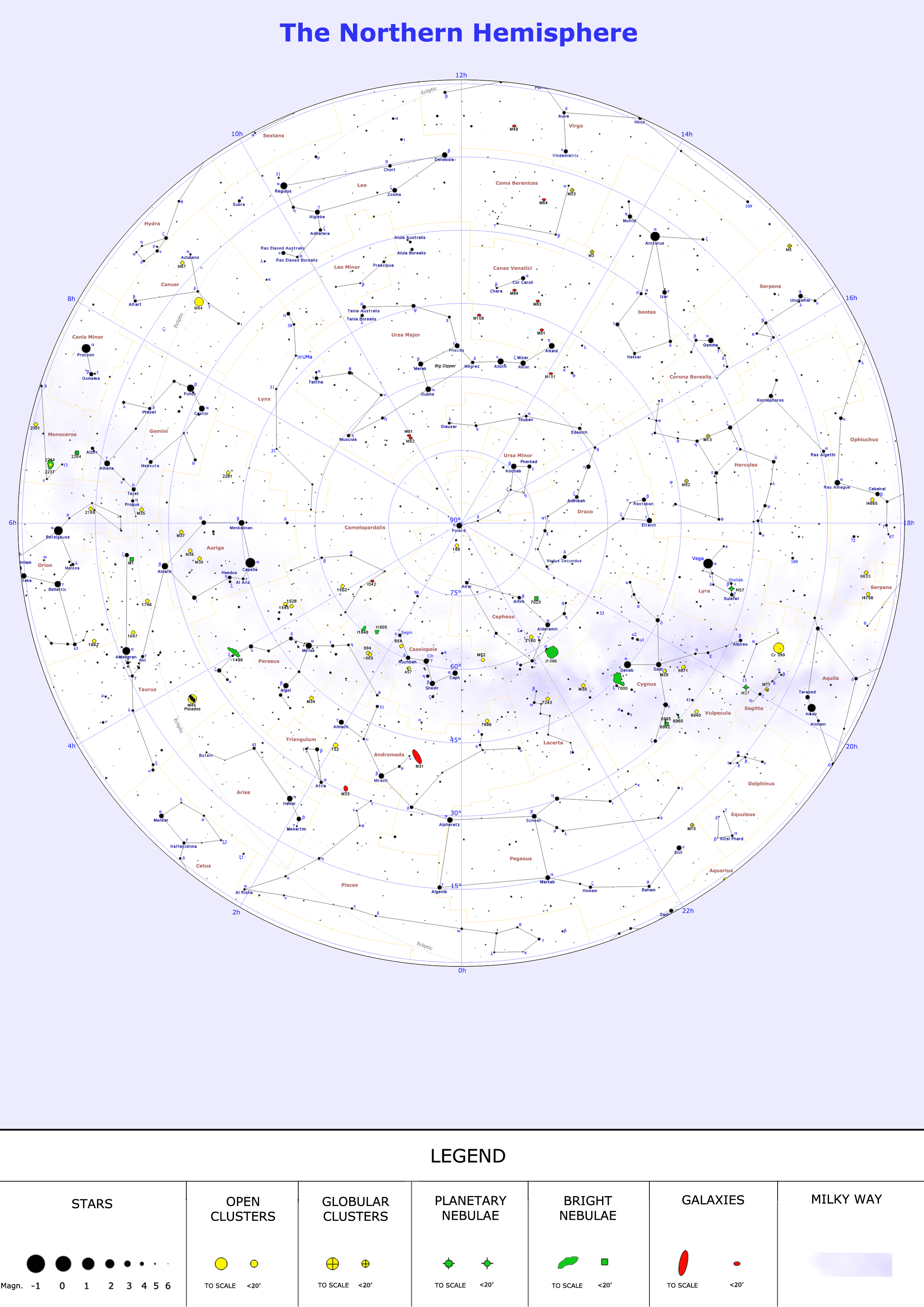
A Northern Hemisphere starchart.

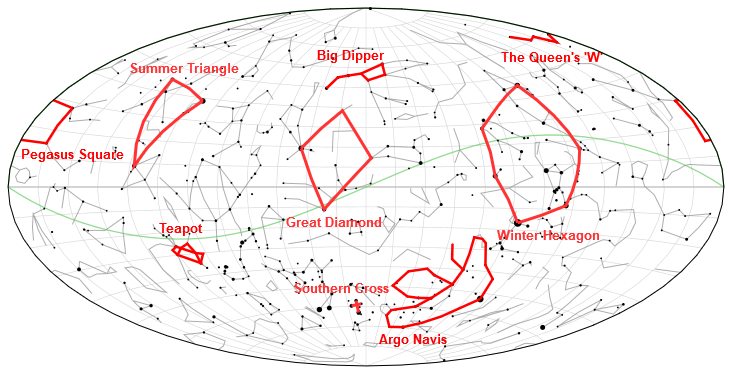
Some major asterisms, featuring many of the brightests stars in the night sky on a celestial map.

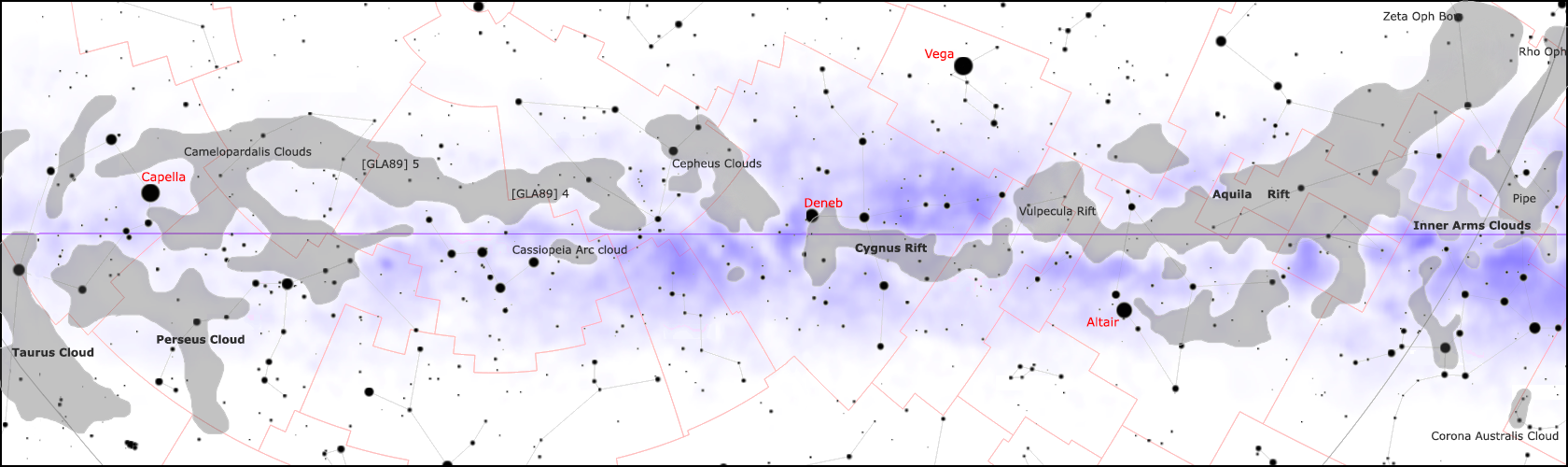
Main dark nebulae of the Solar apex half of the galactic plane.

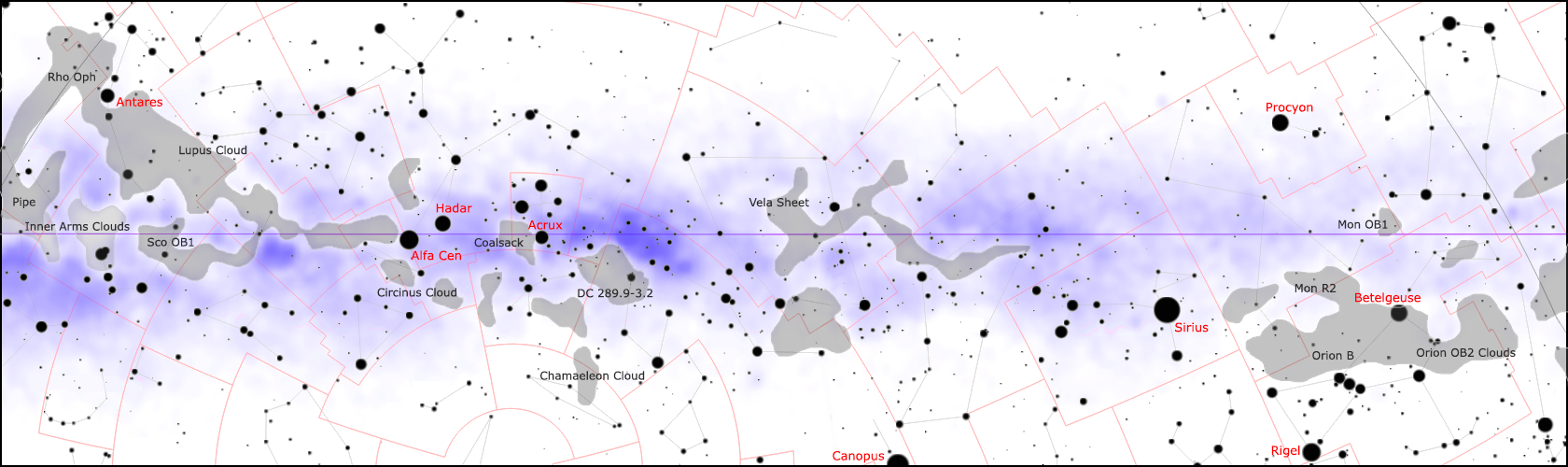
Main dark nebulae of the Solar antapex half of the galactic plane.

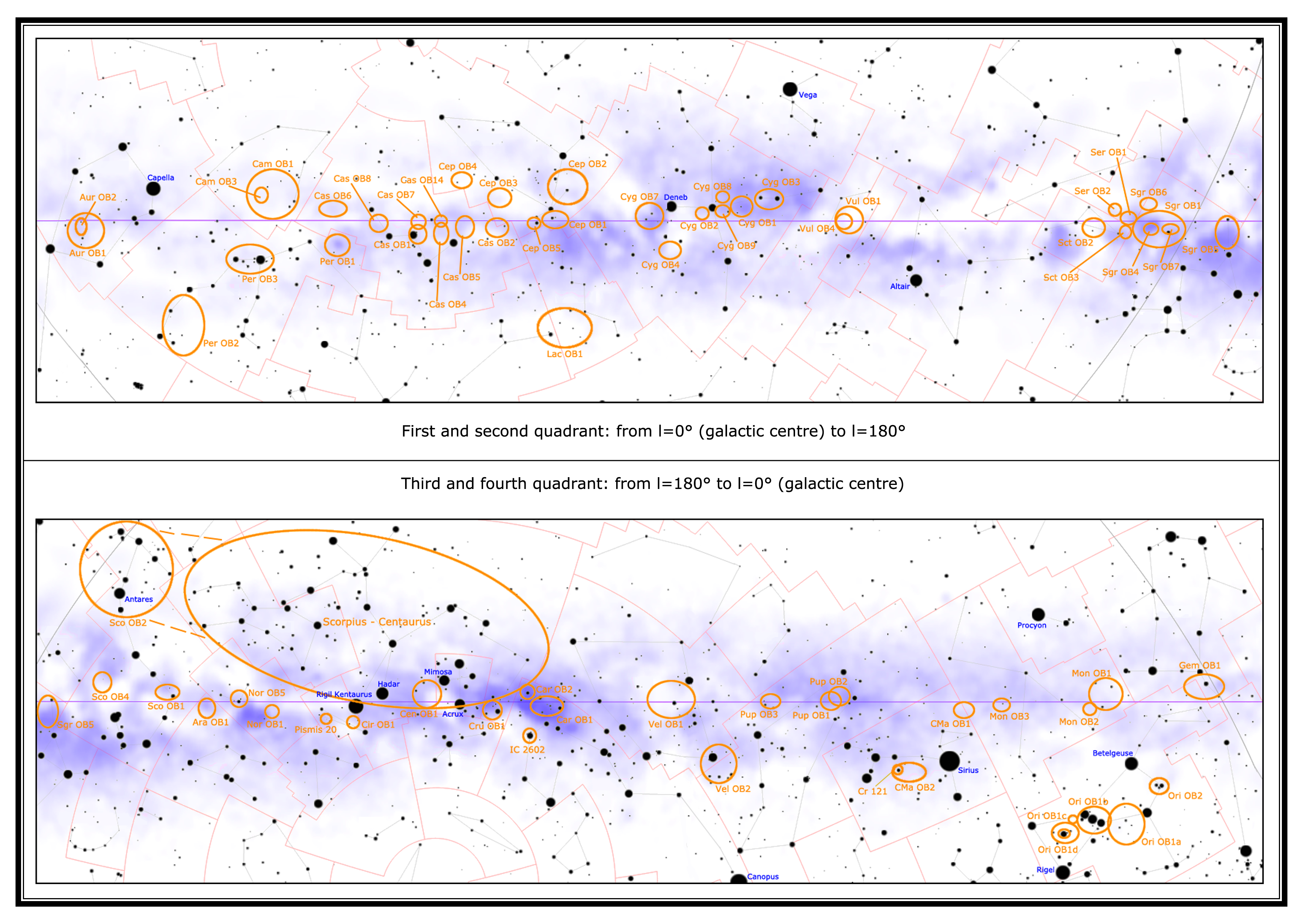
Main stellar associations of the galactic plane in the night sky.

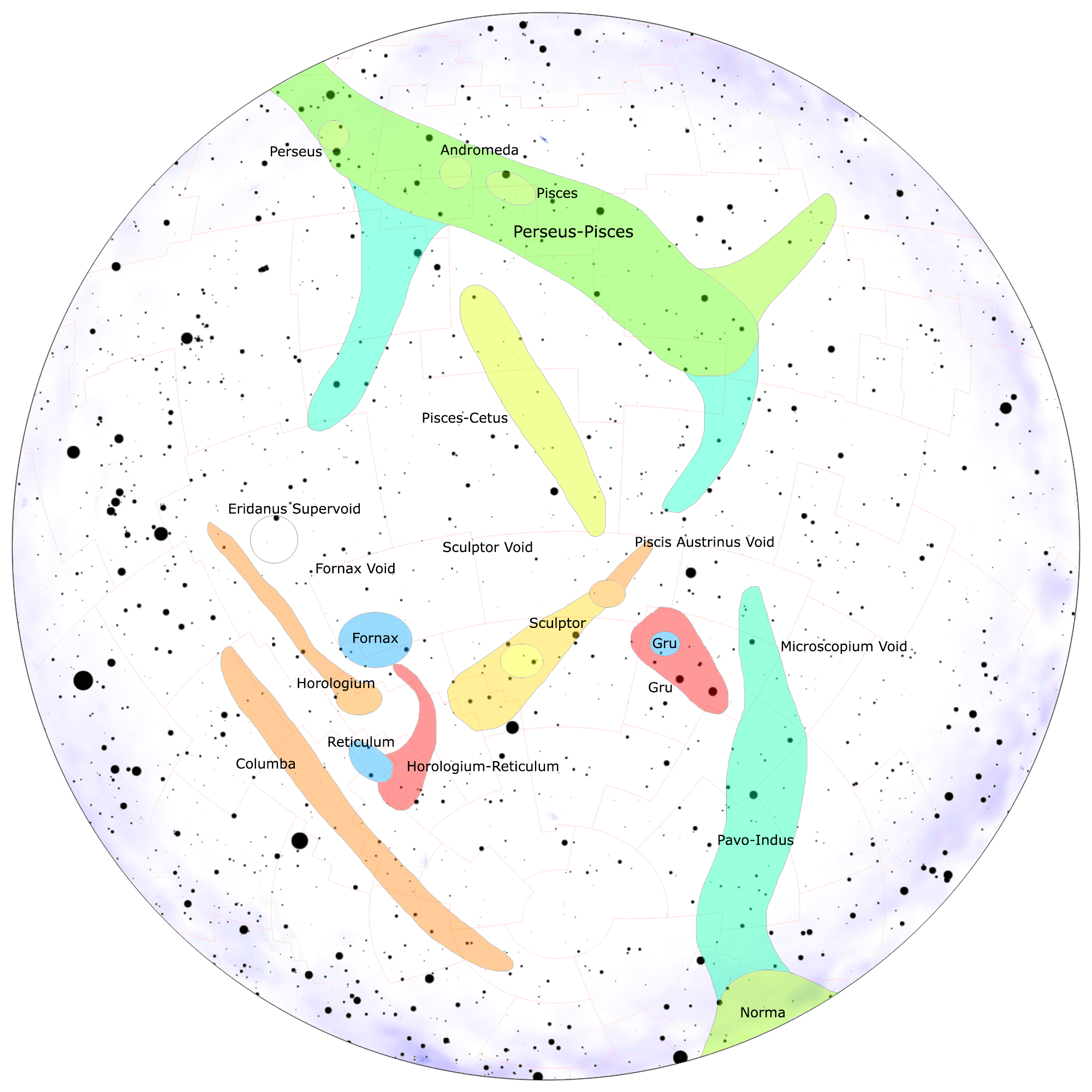
A Southern Hemisphere starchart of groups of galaxies in the night sky.

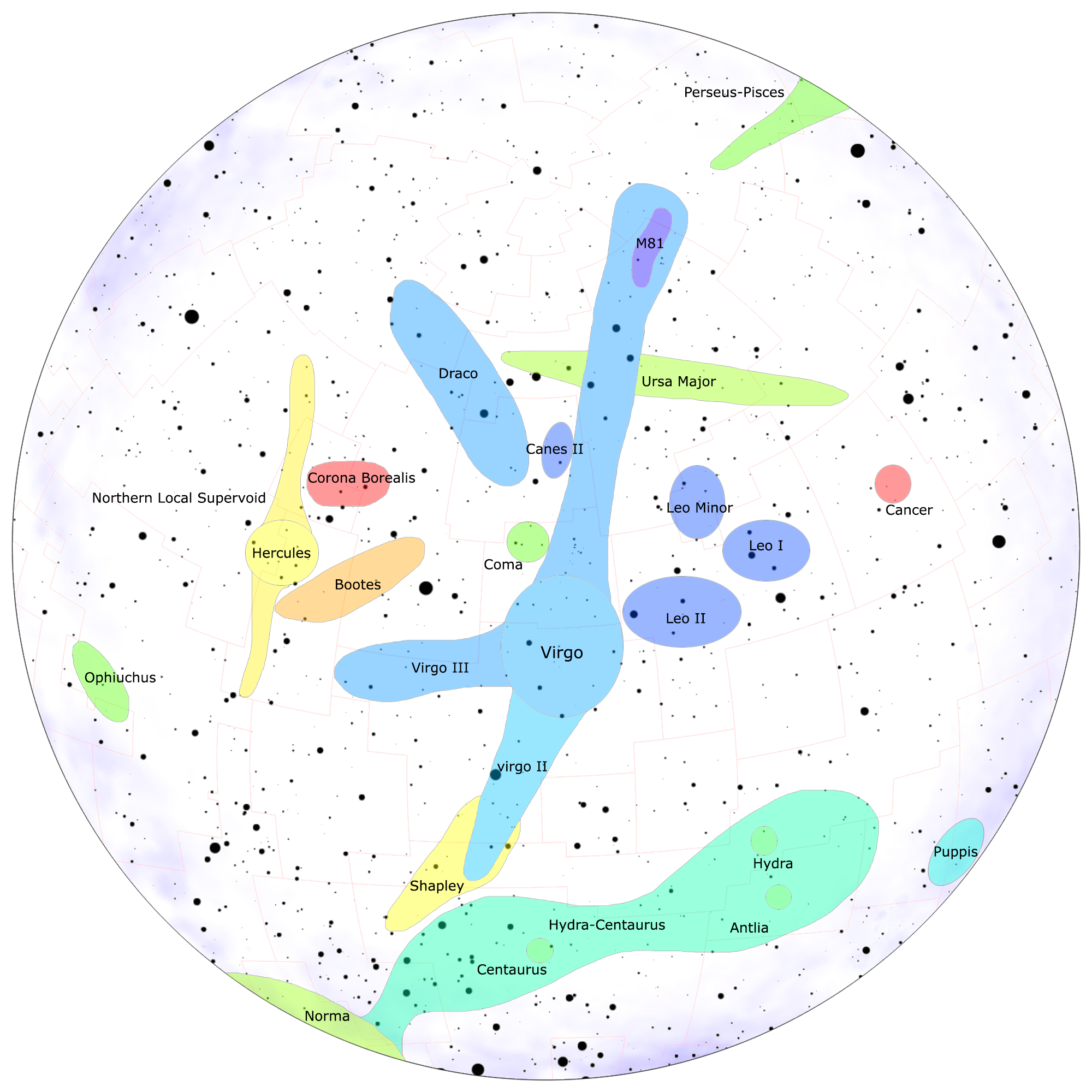
A Northern Hemisphere starchart of groups of galaxies in the night sky.

== Future and past ==
Beside the Solar System objects changing in the course of them and Earth orbiting and changing orbits over time around the Sun and in the case of the Moon around Earth, appearing over time smaller by expanding its orbit, the night sky also changes over the course of the years with stars having a proper motion and changing brightness because of being variable stars, by the distance to them getting larger or other celestial events like supernovas.

Over a timescale of tens of billions of years the night sky in the Local Group may significantly change if the coalescence of the Andromeda Galaxy and the Milky Way merge into a single elliptical galaxy.

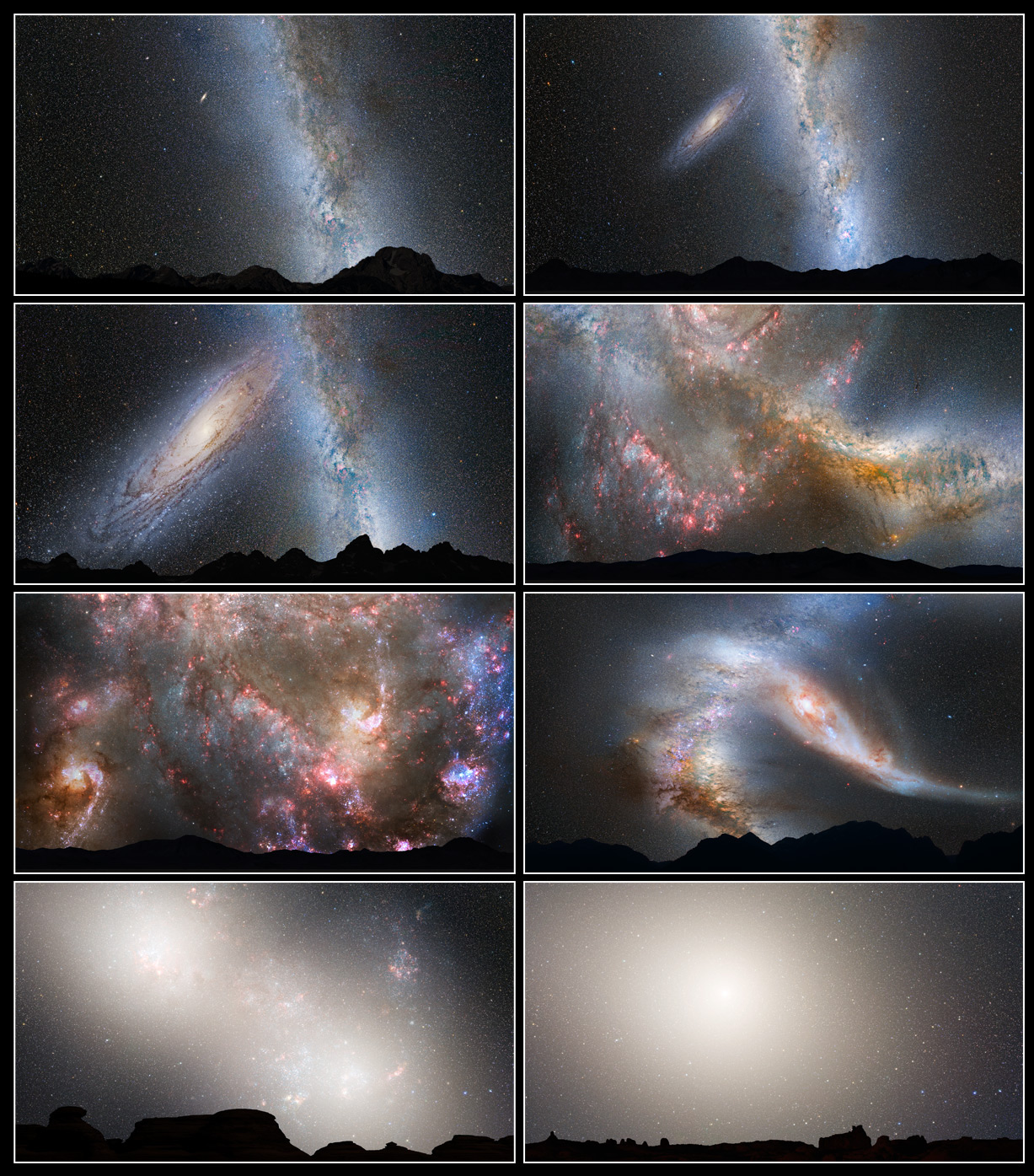
This series of photo illustrations shows the predicted merger between the Milky Way and the neighboring Andromeda Galaxy.

== See also ==
- Amateur astronomy
- Asterism (astronomy)
- Astrology
- Astronomical object
- Constellation
- Earth's shadow
- Olbers' paradox
- Planetarium
