= Airglow =

Faint emission of light by a planetary atmosphere

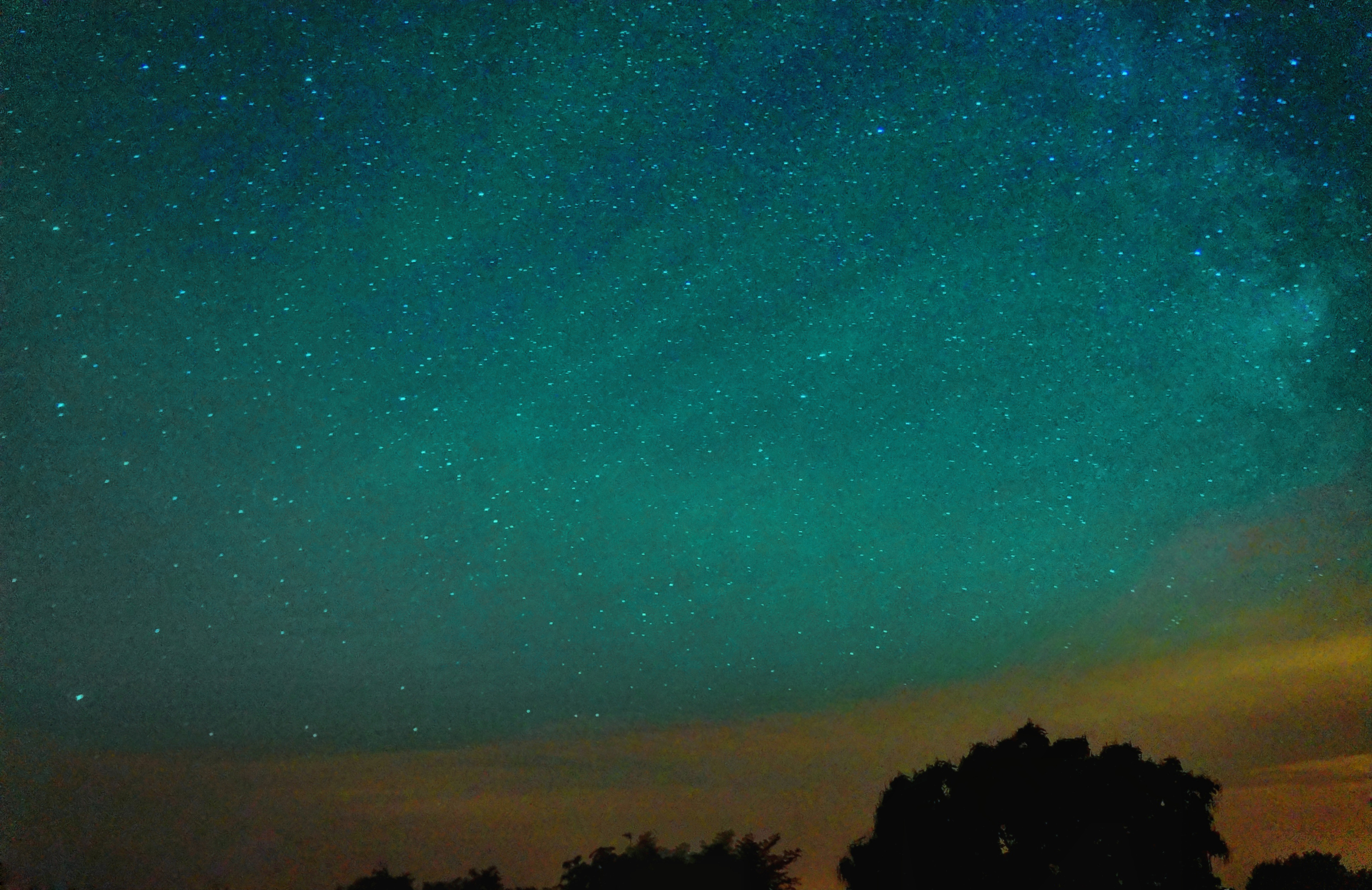
Airglow over Auvergne, France

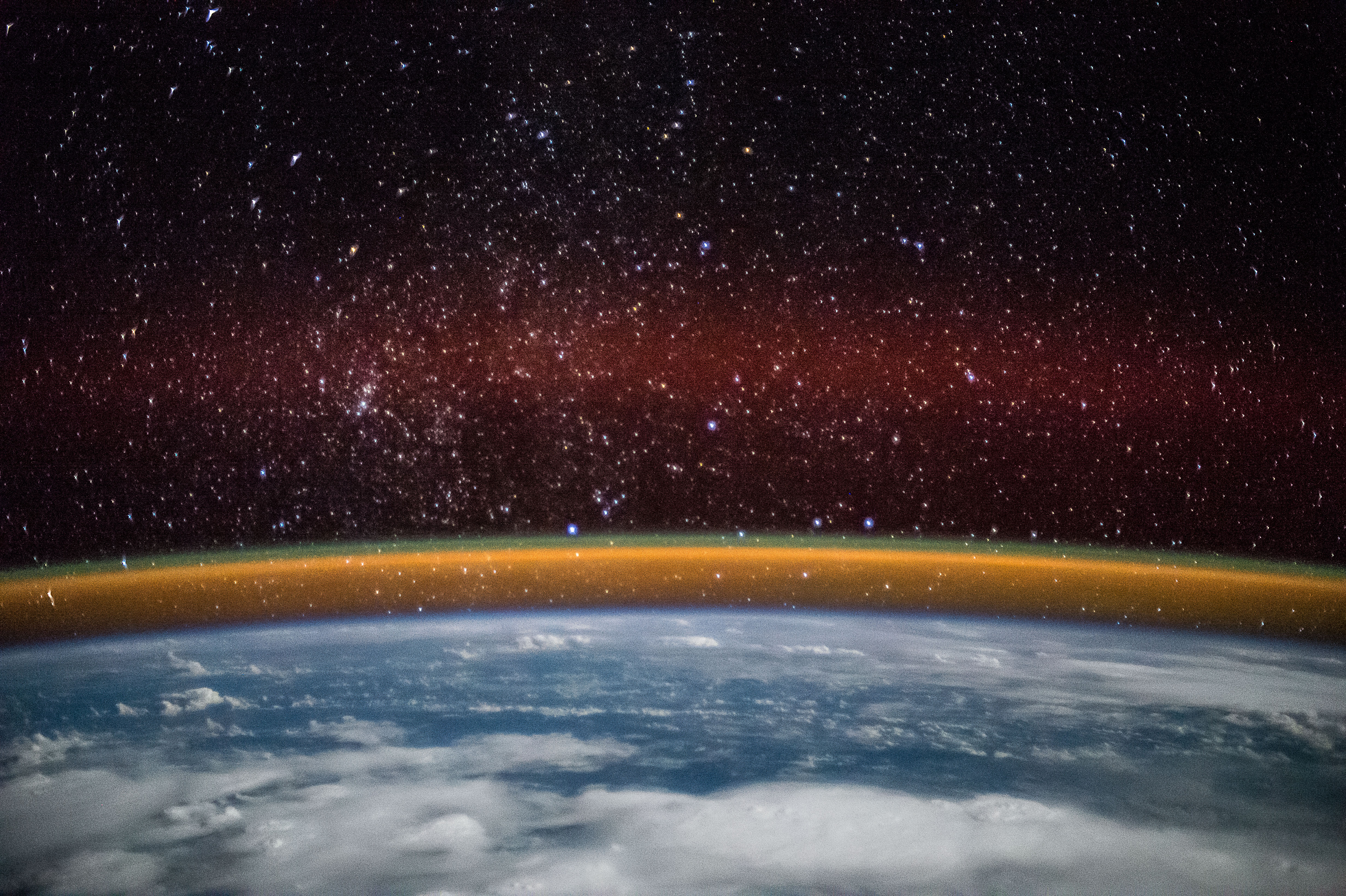
Yellow, green and red bands of airglow along Earth's limb as seen from space.

Airglow is a faint emission of light by a planetary atmosphere. In the case of Earth's atmosphere, this optical phenomenon causes the night sky never to be completely dark, even after the effects of starlight and diffused sunlight from the far side are removed. This phenomenon originates with self-illuminated gases and has no relationship with Earth's magnetism or sunspot activity, causing aurorae.

Airglow occurs in two forms, as a result of a pair of interlinked but different processes. Dayglow occurs during the day and is caused by the splitting of atmospheric molecules but is too faint to be seen in daylight. During the night airglow occurs as nightglow, when the molecules which were split during daytime recombine.

== History ==
The airglow phenomenon was first identified in 1868 by Swedish physicist Anders Ångström. Since then, it has been studied in the laboratory, and various chemical reactions have been observed to emit electromagnetic energy as part of the process. Scientists have identified some of those processes that would be present in Earth's atmosphere, and astronomers have verified that such emissions are present. Simon Newcomb was the first person to scientifically study and describe airglow, in 1901.

Airglow was known to the ancient Greeks: "Aristotle and Pliny the Elder described the phenomena of Chasmata, which can be identified in part as auroras, and in part as bright airglow nights."

== Description ==
Types and layering of airglow above Earth

Airglow looks similar to the at times stronger auroras, though auroras have a different cause.

Airglow is caused by various processes in the upper atmosphere of Earth, such as the recombination of atoms which were photoionized by the Sun during the day, luminescence caused by cosmic rays striking the upper atmosphere, and chemiluminescence caused mainly by oxygen and nitrogen reacting with hydroxyl free radicals at heights of a few hundred kilometres. It is not noticeable during the daytime due to the glare and scattering of sunlight. The airglow resulting from the photoionization in daylight and the recombination at night is called dayglow and nightglow respectively.

Even at the best ground-based observatories, airglow limits the photosensitivity of optical telescopes. Partly for this reason, space telescopes like Hubble can observe much fainter objects than current ground-based telescopes at visible wavelengths.

Airglow at night may be bright enough for a ground observer to notice and appears generally bluish. Although airglow emission is fairly uniform across the atmosphere, it appears brightest at about 10° above the observer's horizon, since the lower one looks, the greater the mass of atmosphere one is looking through. Very low down, however, atmospheric extinction reduces the apparent brightness of the airglow.

One airglow mechanism is when an atom of nitrogen combines with an atom of oxygen to form a molecule of nitric oxide (NO). In the process, a photon is emitted. This photon may have any of several different wavelengths characteristic of nitric oxide molecules. The free atoms are available for this process, because molecules of nitrogen (N_{2}) and oxygen (O_{2}) are dissociated by solar energy in the upper reaches of the atmosphere and may encounter each other to form NO. Other chemicals that can create air glow in the atmosphere are hydroxyl (OH), atomic oxygen (O), sodium (Na), and lithium (Li).

The sky brightness is typically measured in units of apparent magnitude per square arcsecond of sky.

== Calculation ==
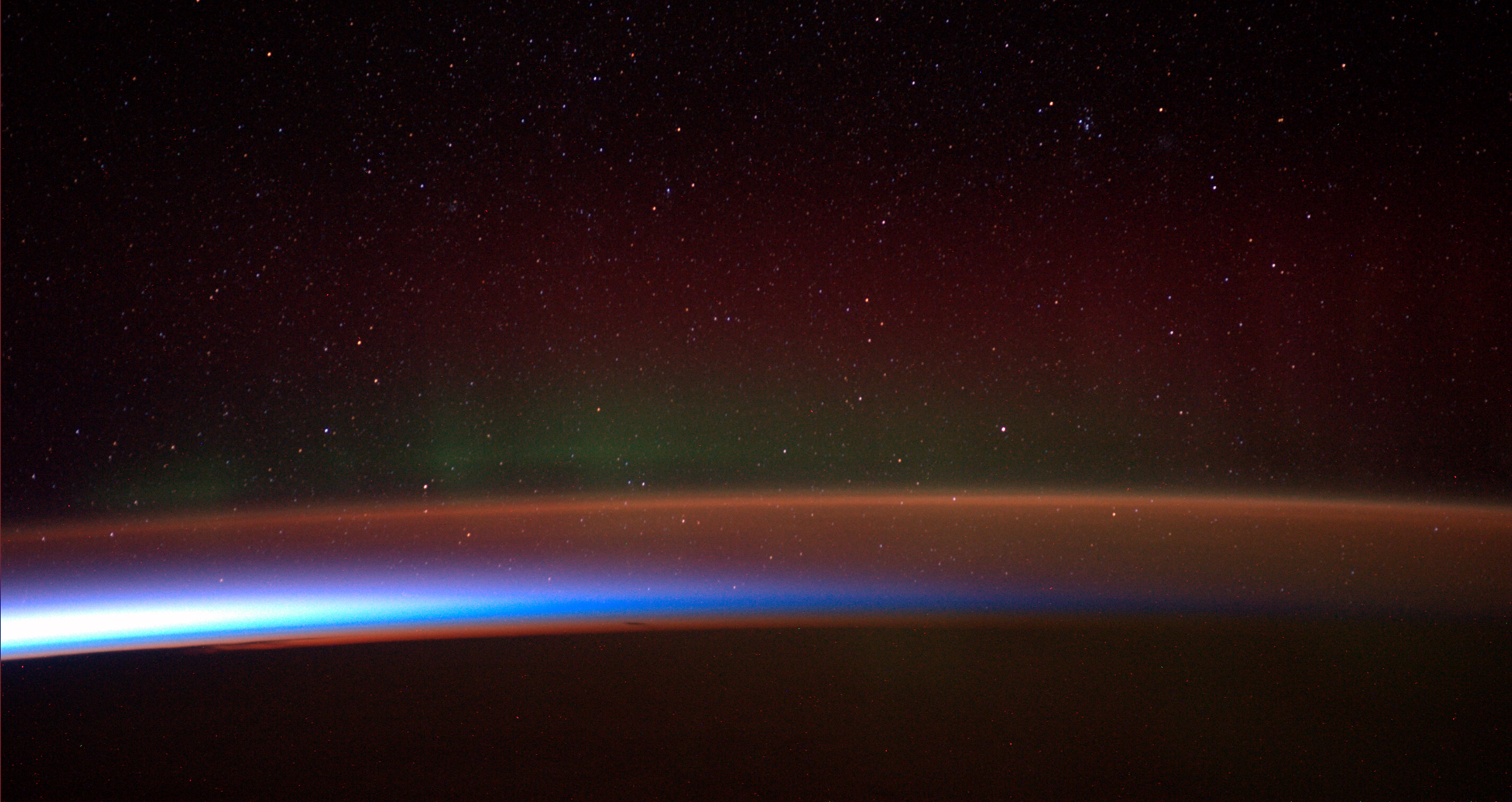
Airglow as pinkish orange sodium line at just below one hundred kilometers and a faint green line, at the edge of space and the lower edge of the thermosphere (invisible), sandwiched between green and red bands of aurorae stretching over several hundred kilometers upward and the pink mesosphere, white and blue stratosphere, as well as orange troposphere afterglow and silhouettes of clouds at the bottom.

In order to calculate the relative intensity of airglow, the apparent magnitudes must be converted into fluxes of photons; this clearly depends on the spectrum of the source, but we will ignore that initially. At visible wavelengths, we need the parameter S_{0}(V), the power per square centimetre of aperture and per micrometre of wavelength produced by a zeroth-magnitude star, to convert apparent magnitudes into fluxes – S_{0}(V) = 4.0×10^{−12} W⋅cm^{−2}⋅µm^{−1}. If we take the example of a V = 28 star observed through a normal V band filter (B = 0.2 μm bandpass, frequency ν ≈ 6×10^{14} Hz), the number of photons we receive per square centimeter of telescope aperture per second from the source is N_{s}:

$$N_\text{s} = 10^{-28/2.5}\times\frac{S_0(V) \times B}{h\nu}$$

(where h is the Planck constant; hν is the energy of a single photon of frequency ν).

At V band, the emission from airglow is V = 22 per square arc-second at a high-altitude observatory on a moonless night; in excellent seeing conditions, the image of a star will be about 0.7 arc-second across with an area of 0.4 square arc-second, and so the emission from airglow over the area of the image corresponds to about V = 23. This gives the number of photons from airglow, N_{a}:

$$N_\text{a} = 10^{-23/2.5}\times\frac{S_0(V) \times B}{h\nu}$$

The signal-to-noise for an ideal ground-based observation with a telescope of area A (ignoring losses and detector noise), arising from Poisson statistics, is only:

$$S/N = \sqrt{A}\times\frac{N_\text{s}}{\sqrt{N_\text{s}+N_\text{a}}}$$

If a 10 m diameter ideal ground-based telescope and an unresolved star are assumed: every second, over a patch the size of the seeing-enlarged image of the star, 35 photons arrive from the star and 3500 from airglow. So, over an hour, roughly 1.3×10^{7} arrive from the airglow, and approximately 1.3×10^{5} arrive from the source; so the S/N ratio is about:

$$\frac{1.3 \times 10^5}{\sqrt{1.3 \times 10^7}} \approx 36.$$

We can compare this with "real" answers from exposure time calculators. For an 8 m unit Very Large Telescope telescope, according to the FORS exposure time calculator, 40 hours of observing time are needed to reach V = 28, while the 2.4 m Hubble only takes 4 hours according to the ACS exposure time calculator. A hypothetical 8 m Hubble telescope would take about 30 minutes.

This calculation shows that reducing the view field size can make fainter objects more detectable against the airglow; unfortunately, adaptive optics techniques that reduce the diameter of the view field of an Earth-based telescope by an order of magnitude only as yet work in the infrared, where the sky is much brighter. A space telescope is not restricted by the view field, since it is not affected by airglow.

== Induced airglow ==
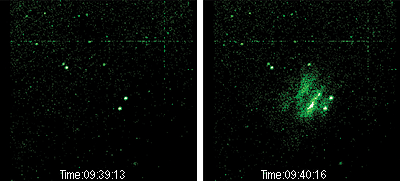
Two images of the sky over the HAARP Gakona facility using the NRL-cooled CCD imager at 557.7 nm. The field of view is approximately 38°. The left-hand image shows the background star field with the HF transmitter off. The right-hand image was taken 63 seconds later with the HF transmitter on. Structure is evident in the emission region.

Scientific experiments have been conducted to induce airglow by directing high-power radio emissions at the Earth's ionosphere. These radiowaves interact with the ionosphere to induce faint but visible optical light at specific wavelengths under certain conditions. The effect is also observable in the radio frequency band, using ionosondes.

== Experimental observation ==
SwissCube-1 is a Swiss satellite operated by Ecole Polytechnique Fédérale de Lausanne. The spacecraft is a single unit CubeSat, which was designed to conduct research into airglow within the Earth's atmosphere and to develop technology for future spacecraft. Though SwissCube-1 is rather small (10 cm × 10 cm × 10 cm) and weighs less than 1 kg, it carries a small telescope for obtaining images of the airglow. The first SwissCube-1 image came down on 18 February 2011 and was quite black with some thermal noise on it. The first airglow image came down on 3 March 2011. This image has been converted to the human optical range (green) from its near-infrared measurement. This image provides a measurement of the intensity of the airglow phenomenon in the near-infrared. The range measured is from 500 to 61400 photons, with a resolution of 500 photons.

== Observation of airglow on other planets ==
=== Venus ===
The European Space Agency's Venus Express spacecraft contained an infrared sensor which has detected near-IR emissions from the upper atmosphere of Venus. The emissions come from nitric oxide (NO) and from molecular oxygen. Scientists had previously determined in laboratory testing that during NO production, ultraviolet emissions and near-IR emissions were produced. The UV radiation had been detected in the atmosphere, but until this mission, the atmosphere-produced near-IR emissions were only theoretical. Airglow on Venus is the most likely candidate for the illusive ashen light having been observed from Earth since the 17th century.

=== Mars ===
In 2020, scientists reported the first detection of green oxygen airglow in Mars's atmosphere. They used the European Space Agency's TGO spacecraft, specifically its NOMAD instrument pointing at the edge of Mars, similarly to analogous observations of Earth airglow from the ISS.

== Gallery ==
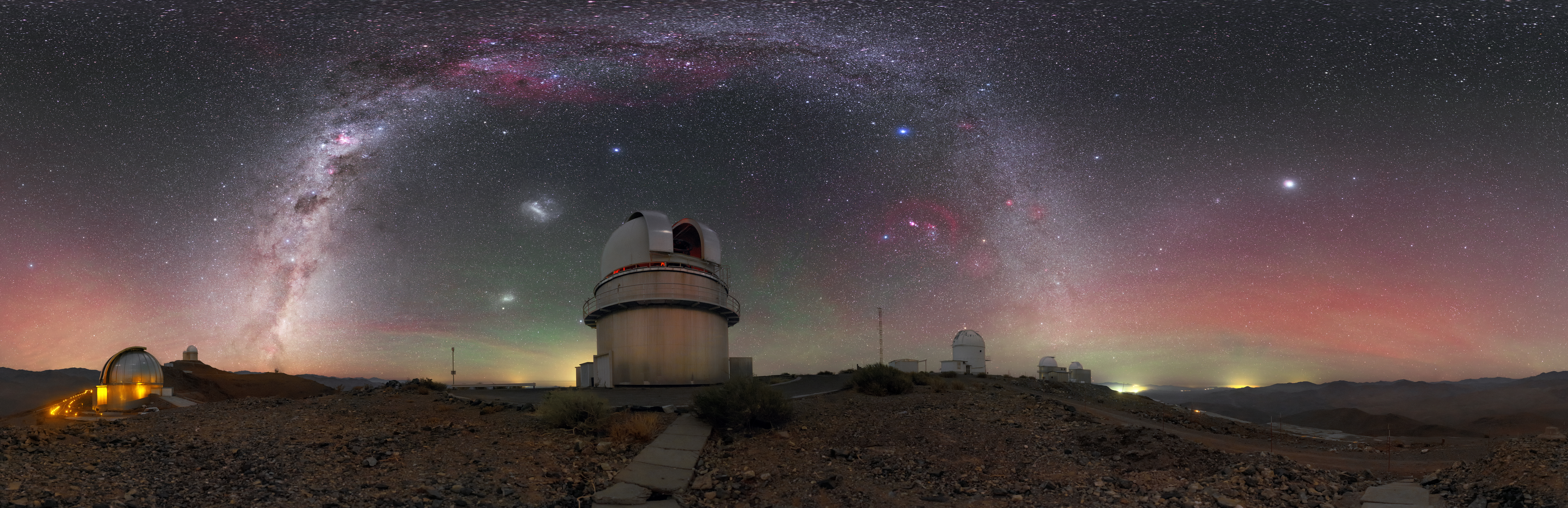
Hues of red and green lighting up the sky are produced by airglow.

Airglow over Paranal Observatory.

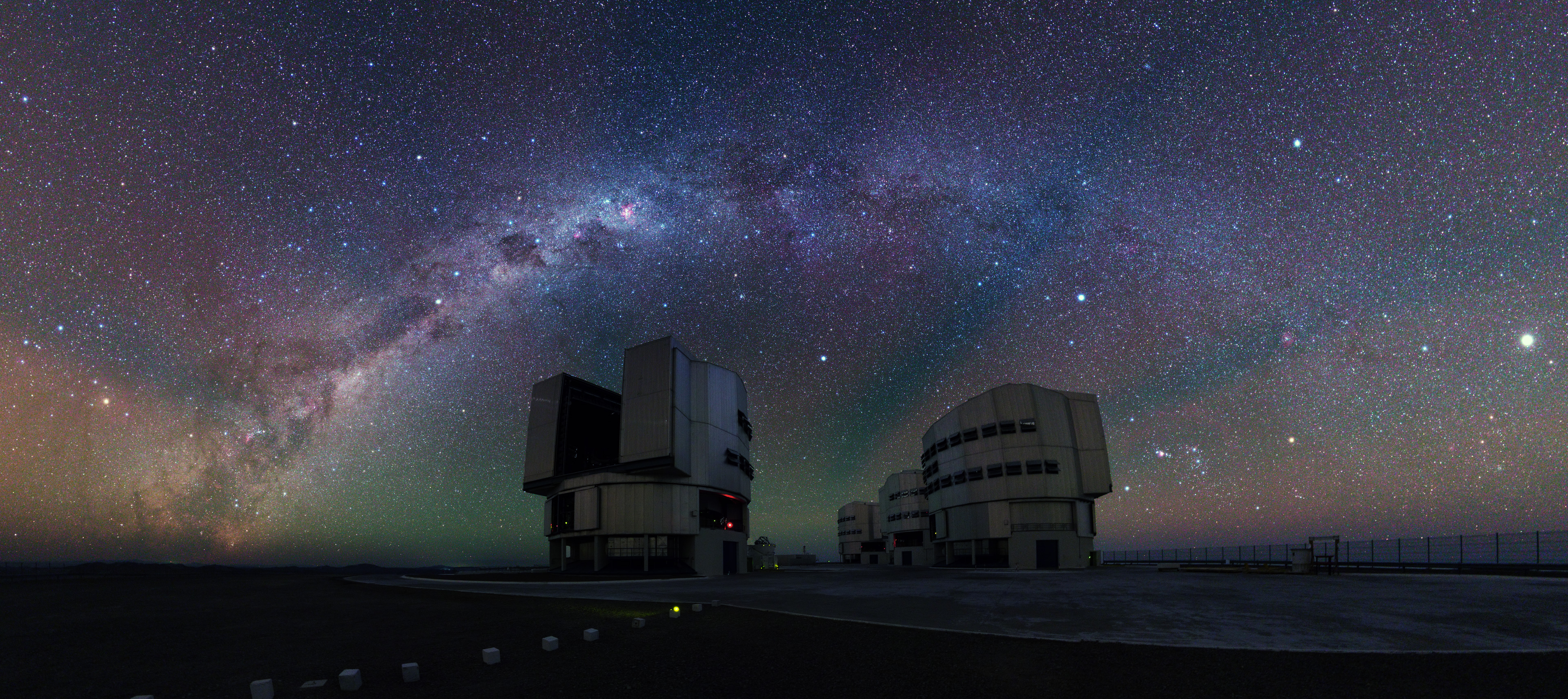
Airglow over the VLT platform

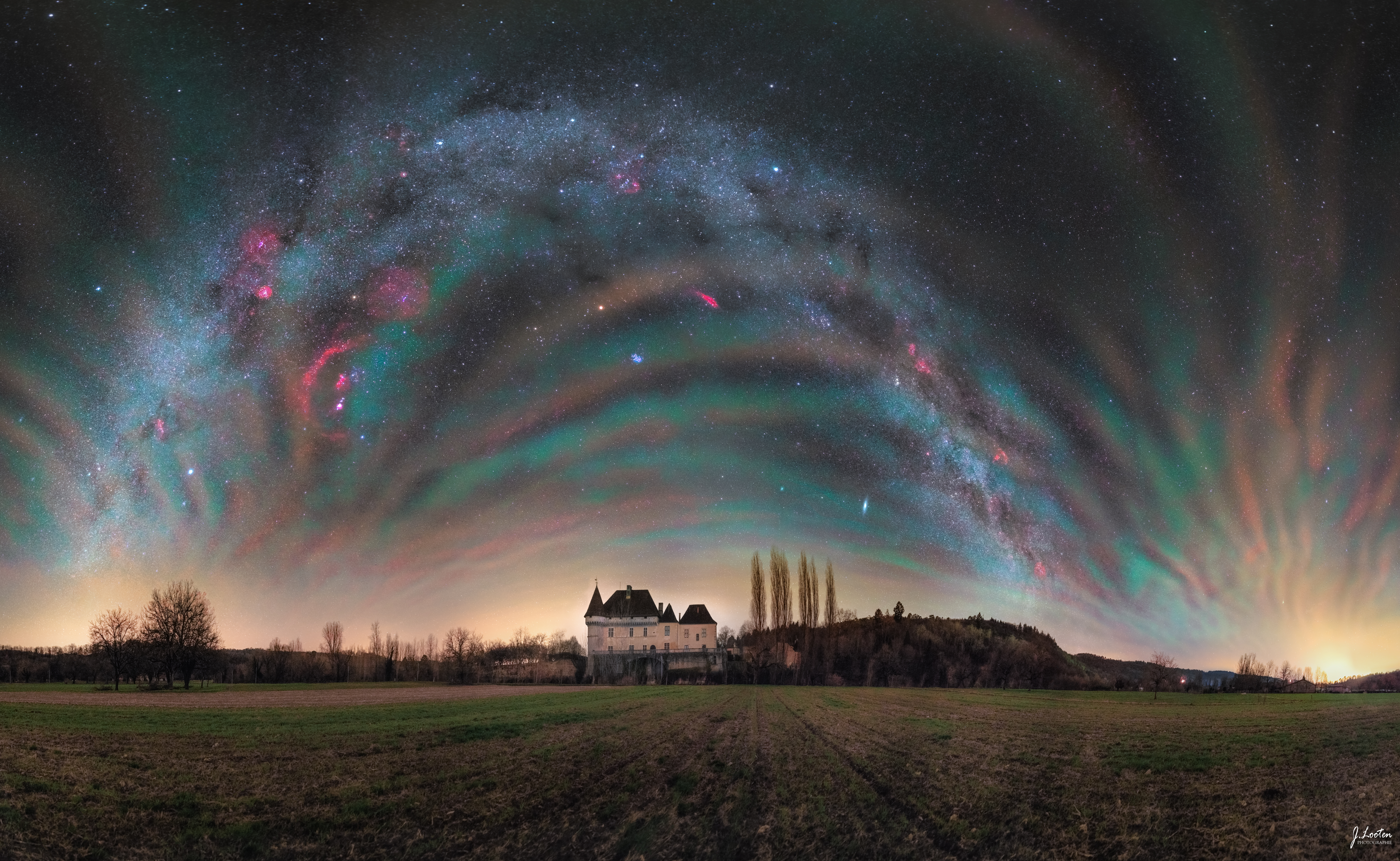
Airglow over Dordogne, France.

Airglow timelapse from space, with a broad red band of airglow.

== See also ==
- Earthlight
- Ionized-air glow
- Optical phenomena
- Polar aurora
- Zodiacal light
