= Starlight =

Light from the stars

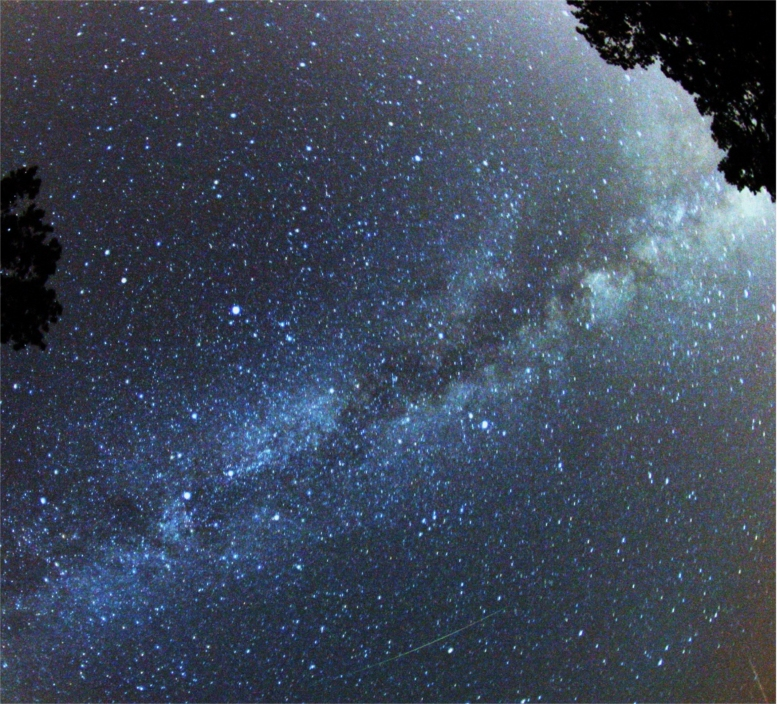
Starry sky crossed with the Milky Way and a meteor

Starlight is the light emitted by stars. It typically refers to visible electromagnetic radiation from stars other than the Sun, observable from Earth at night, although a component of starlight is observable from Earth during daytime.

Sunlight is the term used for the Sun's starlight observed during daytime. During nighttime, albedo describes solar reflections from other Solar System objects, including moonlight, planetshine, and zodiacal light.

== Observation ==
Observation and measurement of starlight through telescopes is the basis for many fields of astronomy, including photometry and stellar spectroscopy. Hipparchus did not have a telescope or any instrument that could measure apparent brightness accurately, so he simply made estimates with his eyes. He sorted the stars into six brightness categories, which he called magnitudes. He referred to the brightest stars in his catalog as first-magnitude stars and those so faint he could barely see them as sixth-magnitude stars.

Starlight is also a notable part of personal experience and human culture, impacting a diverse range of pursuits including poetry, astronomy, and military strategy.

The United States Army spent millions of dollars in the 1950s and onward to develop a starlight scope, that could amplify starlight, moonlight filtered by clouds, and the fluorescence of rotting vegetation about 50,000 times to allow a person to see in the night. In contrast to previously developed active infrared system such as sniperscope, it was a passive device and did not require additional light emission to see.

The average color of starlight in the observable universe is a shade of yellowish-white that has been given the name Cosmic Latte.

Starlight spectroscopy, examination of the stellar spectra, was pioneered by Joseph Fraunhofer in 1814. Starlight can be understood to be composed of three main spectra types, continuous spectrum, emission spectrum, and absorption spectrum.

Starlight illuminance coincides with the human eye's minimum illuminance (~0.1 mlx) while moonlight coincides with the human eye's minimum colour vision illuminance (~50 mlx).

One of the oldest stars yet identified - oldest but not most distant in this case - was identified in 2014: while "only" 6,000 light years away, the star SMSS J031300.36−670839.3 was determined to be 13.8 billion years old, or more or less the same age as the universe itself. The starlight shining on Earth includes this star.

== Photography ==
Night photography includes photographing subjects that are lit primarily by starlight. Directly taking images of night sky is also a part of astrophotography. Like other photography, it can be used for the pursuit of science and/or leisure. Subjects include nocturnal animals. In many cases starlight photography may also overlap with a need to understand the impact of moonlight.

== Polarization ==
Starlight intensity has been observed to be a function of its polarization.

Starlight becomes partially linearly polarized by scattering from elongated interstellar dust grains whose long axes tend to be oriented perpendicular to the galactic magnetic field. According to the Davis–Greenstein mechanism, the grains spin rapidly with their rotation axis along the magnetic field. Light polarized along the direction of the magnetic field perpendicular to the line of sight is transmitted, while light polarized in the plane defined by the rotating grain is blocked. Thus the polarization direction can be used to map the galactic magnetic field. The degree of polarization is on the order of 1.5% for stars at 1,000 parsecs' distance.

Normally, a much smaller fraction of circular polarization is found in starlight. Serkowski, Mathewson and Ford measured the polarization of 180 stars in UBVR filters. They found a maximum fractional circular polarization of $q = 6 \times 10^{-4}$, in the R filter.

The explanation is that the interstellar medium is optically thin. Starlight traveling through a kiloparsec column undergoes about a magnitude of extinction, so that the optical depth ~ 1. An optical depth of 1 corresponds to a mean free path, which is the distance, on average that a photon travels before scattering from a dust grain. So on average, a starlight photon is scattered from a single interstellar grain; multiple scattering (which produces circular polarization) is much less likely. Observationally, the linear polarization fraction p ~ 0.015 from a single scattering; circular polarization from multiple scattering goes as $p^{2}$, so we expect a circularly polarized fraction of $q \sim 2 \times 10^{-4}$.

Light from early-type stars has very little intrinsic polarization. Kemp et al. measured the optical polarization of the Sun at sensitivity of $3 \times 10^{-7}$; they found upper limits of $10^{-6}$ for both $p$ (fraction of linear polarization) and $q$ (fraction of circular polarization).

The interstellar medium can produce circularly polarized (CP) light from unpolarized light by sequential scattering from elongated interstellar grains aligned in different directions. One possibility is twisted grain alignment along the line of sight due to variation in the galactic magnetic field; another is the line of sight passes through multiple clouds. For these mechanisms the maximum expected CP fraction is $q \sim p^{2}$, where $p$ is the fraction of linearly polarized (LP) light. Kemp & Wolstencroft found CP in six early-type stars (no intrinsic polarization), which they were able to attribute to the first mechanism mentioned above. In all cases, $q \sim 10^{-4}$ in blue light.

Martin showed that the interstellar medium can convert LP light to CP by scattering from partially aligned interstellar grains having a complex index of refraction. This effect was observed for light from the Crab Nebula by Martin, Illing and Angel.

An optically thick circumstellar environment can potentially produce much larger CP than the interstellar medium. Martin suggested that LP light can become CP near a star by multiple scattering in an optically thick asymmetric circumstellar dust cloud. This mechanism was invoked by Bastien, Robert and Nadeau, to explain the CP measured in 6 T-Tauri stars at a wavelength of 768 nm. They found a maximum CP of $q \sim 7 \times 10^{-4}$. Serkowski measured CP of $q = 7 \times 10^{-3}$ for the red supergiant NML Cygni and $q = 2 \times 10^{-3}$ in the long-period variable M star VY Canis Majoris in the H band, ascribing the CP to multiple scattering in circumstellar envelopes. Chrysostomou et al. found CP with q of up to 0.17 in the Orion OMC-1 star-forming region, and explained it by reflection of starlight from aligned oblate grains in the dusty nebula.

Circular polarization of zodiacal light and Milky Way diffuse galactic light was measured at wavelength of 550 nm by Wolstencroft and Kemp. They found values of $q \sim 5 \times 10^{-3}$, which is higher than for ordinary stars, presumably because of multiple scattering from dust grains.

== See also ==
- List of brightest stars
- Purkinje effect
- Sunlight
- Moonlight
