= Outline of Earth =

Third planet from the sun

The following outline is provided as an overview of and topical guide to the planet Earth:

Earth – third planet from the Sun, the densest planet in the Solar System, the largest of the Solar System's four terrestrial planets, and the only astronomical object known to harbor life.

== Classification of Earth ==
- Astronomical object
  - Gravitationally rounded object
    - Planet
      - Planet of the Solar System
        - Inner planet
      - Terrestrial planet

== Location of Earth ==
Earth's location in the Universe

- Universe – all of time and space and its contents.
  - Observable universe – spherical region of the Universe comprising all matter that may be observed from Earth at the present time, because light and other signals from these objects have had time to reach Earth since the beginning of the cosmological expansion.
    - Laniakea Supercluster – galaxy supercluster that is home to the Milky Way and approximately 100,000 other nearby galaxies. Includes the prior defined local supercluster, the Virgo Supercluster, as an appendage.
      - Virgo Supercluster – one of the approximately 10 million superclusters in the observable universe. It spans 33 megaparsecs (110 million light-years), and contains at least 100 galaxy groups and clusters, including the Local Group.
        - Local Group – specific galaxy group that includes the Milky Way and at least 53 other galaxies, most of them dwarf galaxies.
          - Milky Way Galaxy – a specific barred spiral galaxy
            - Orion Arm – a spiral arm of the Milky Way
              - Solar System – the Sun and the objects that orbit it, including eight planets, the third planet closest to the Sun being Earth
                - Earth's orbit – path through which the Earth travels around the Sun. The average distance between the Earth and the Sun is 149.60 million kilometers (92.96 million miles).

== Movement of the Earth ==
- Earth's orbit
- Earth's rotation
- Earth's precession

== Features of Earth ==
- Age of the Earth
- Figure of the Earth (size and shape)
- Earth radius
- Models of the Earth
  - Globe
  - World map
  - Gravity of Earth
  - Earth's magnetic field
  - Natural environment

=== Earth's spheres ===
==== Earth's biosphere ====
- Ecosystems
- Biomes
- biogeographic realms
- Marine realms
- Bioregions
- Ecoregions (list)
- Anthroposphere
- Noosphere

==== Earth's geosphere ====
- Structure of the Earth
- Earth's surface
- Lithosphere of Earth (solid Earth)
- Earth's crust
- Land
- Landforms (list)
- Continents
- Africa
- Antarctica
- Asia
- Australia
- Europe
- North America
- South America
- Pedosphere
- Ocean floor
- Earth's mantle
- Earth's core
- Outer core
- Inner core

==== Earth's hydrosphere ====
This sphere represents all water on Earth, wherever it is and in whatever form within the water cycle.

- Water, by relative altitude

===== Atmospheric water =====
- Water vapor
- Clouds
- Precipitation

===== Cryosphere (frozen water) =====
- Polar ice caps
- Ice sheets
- Ice caps
- Glaciers

===== Surface water =====
- Bodies of water (list)
- World Ocean
- Southern Ocean
- Oceans - This includes the Earth's five oceans: The Arctic Ocean, the Atlantic Ocean, the Indian Ocean, and the Pacific Ocean.
- Groundwater

===== Water, by salt content =====
- Fresh water
- Brackish water
- Seawater

=== Astronomical events on Earth ===
- Meteor showers (list)
- Meteorite falls
- Tides
- Eclipse - This includes both a lunar eclipse and solar eclipse.
- Equinox - This includes both the March equinox and the September equinox.
- Solstice - This includes the Summer solstice, June solstice, Winter solstice, and December solstice
  - Stonehenge
  - Manhattanhenge

=== Natural satellites of Earth ===
- Moon

== History of Earth ==
History of Earth

- Age of the Earth
- Geocentric model
- Geological history of Earth
  - Geologic time scale
  - Early Earth
- Timeline of natural history
- Human history

== Future of Earth ==
Future of Earth

- Climate change
- Global catastrophic risk

== See also ==
- Earth and atmospheric sciences journals
- Earth phase
- Earth sciences
  - List of fields of science that study the Earth
- Geoscience organizations
- List of environmental organizations
- Outline of the Solar System
- World
